

124001–124100 

|-bgcolor=#d6d6d6
| 124001 ||  || — || March 19, 2001 || Socorro || LINEAR || — || align=right | 5.9 km || 
|-id=002 bgcolor=#d6d6d6
| 124002 ||  || — || March 19, 2001 || Socorro || LINEAR || — || align=right | 4.9 km || 
|-id=003 bgcolor=#d6d6d6
| 124003 ||  || — || March 21, 2001 || Socorro || LINEAR || — || align=right | 7.1 km || 
|-id=004 bgcolor=#d6d6d6
| 124004 ||  || — || March 23, 2001 || Socorro || LINEAR || — || align=right | 7.7 km || 
|-id=005 bgcolor=#d6d6d6
| 124005 ||  || — || March 23, 2001 || Socorro || LINEAR || — || align=right | 4.7 km || 
|-id=006 bgcolor=#d6d6d6
| 124006 ||  || — || March 21, 2001 || Anderson Mesa || LONEOS || — || align=right | 4.8 km || 
|-id=007 bgcolor=#d6d6d6
| 124007 ||  || — || March 26, 2001 || Kitt Peak || Spacewatch || THM || align=right | 3.2 km || 
|-id=008 bgcolor=#d6d6d6
| 124008 ||  || — || March 26, 2001 || Socorro || LINEAR || THM || align=right | 5.7 km || 
|-id=009 bgcolor=#d6d6d6
| 124009 ||  || — || March 16, 2001 || Kitt Peak || Spacewatch || — || align=right | 5.9 km || 
|-id=010 bgcolor=#d6d6d6
| 124010 ||  || — || March 16, 2001 || Socorro || LINEAR || HYG || align=right | 6.8 km || 
|-id=011 bgcolor=#d6d6d6
| 124011 ||  || — || March 16, 2001 || Socorro || LINEAR || — || align=right | 6.0 km || 
|-id=012 bgcolor=#d6d6d6
| 124012 ||  || — || March 16, 2001 || Socorro || LINEAR || EOS || align=right | 5.2 km || 
|-id=013 bgcolor=#d6d6d6
| 124013 ||  || — || March 17, 2001 || Socorro || LINEAR || ALA || align=right | 6.7 km || 
|-id=014 bgcolor=#d6d6d6
| 124014 ||  || — || March 17, 2001 || Socorro || LINEAR || EMA || align=right | 7.9 km || 
|-id=015 bgcolor=#d6d6d6
| 124015 ||  || — || March 17, 2001 || Socorro || LINEAR || — || align=right | 7.8 km || 
|-id=016 bgcolor=#d6d6d6
| 124016 ||  || — || March 18, 2001 || Socorro || LINEAR || THM || align=right | 4.4 km || 
|-id=017 bgcolor=#d6d6d6
| 124017 ||  || — || March 18, 2001 || Socorro || LINEAR || KOR || align=right | 3.2 km || 
|-id=018 bgcolor=#d6d6d6
| 124018 ||  || — || March 18, 2001 || Anderson Mesa || LONEOS || KOR || align=right | 3.2 km || 
|-id=019 bgcolor=#d6d6d6
| 124019 ||  || — || March 18, 2001 || Haleakala || NEAT || — || align=right | 5.3 km || 
|-id=020 bgcolor=#d6d6d6
| 124020 ||  || — || March 18, 2001 || Socorro || LINEAR || — || align=right | 5.1 km || 
|-id=021 bgcolor=#d6d6d6
| 124021 ||  || — || March 18, 2001 || Socorro || LINEAR || — || align=right | 6.9 km || 
|-id=022 bgcolor=#d6d6d6
| 124022 ||  || — || March 18, 2001 || Socorro || LINEAR || — || align=right | 5.3 km || 
|-id=023 bgcolor=#d6d6d6
| 124023 ||  || — || March 18, 2001 || Haleakala || NEAT || — || align=right | 4.7 km || 
|-id=024 bgcolor=#d6d6d6
| 124024 ||  || — || March 18, 2001 || Haleakala || NEAT || — || align=right | 5.6 km || 
|-id=025 bgcolor=#d6d6d6
| 124025 ||  || — || March 19, 2001 || Anderson Mesa || LONEOS || — || align=right | 6.2 km || 
|-id=026 bgcolor=#d6d6d6
| 124026 ||  || — || March 19, 2001 || Anderson Mesa || LONEOS || HYG || align=right | 5.3 km || 
|-id=027 bgcolor=#d6d6d6
| 124027 ||  || — || March 19, 2001 || Haleakala || NEAT || THB || align=right | 6.8 km || 
|-id=028 bgcolor=#d6d6d6
| 124028 ||  || — || March 20, 2001 || Haleakala || NEAT || — || align=right | 3.4 km || 
|-id=029 bgcolor=#d6d6d6
| 124029 ||  || — || March 26, 2001 || Socorro || LINEAR || EOS || align=right | 3.6 km || 
|-id=030 bgcolor=#d6d6d6
| 124030 ||  || — || March 23, 2001 || Haleakala || NEAT || — || align=right | 4.8 km || 
|-id=031 bgcolor=#d6d6d6
| 124031 ||  || — || March 23, 2001 || Anderson Mesa || LONEOS || TIR || align=right | 5.5 km || 
|-id=032 bgcolor=#d6d6d6
| 124032 ||  || — || March 26, 2001 || Socorro || LINEAR || slow || align=right | 8.5 km || 
|-id=033 bgcolor=#d6d6d6
| 124033 ||  || — || March 29, 2001 || Bagnall Beach || G. Crawford || ALA || align=right | 5.8 km || 
|-id=034 bgcolor=#d6d6d6
| 124034 ||  || — || March 29, 2001 || Socorro || LINEAR || — || align=right | 4.1 km || 
|-id=035 bgcolor=#d6d6d6
| 124035 ||  || — || March 20, 2001 || Haleakala || NEAT || — || align=right | 6.3 km || 
|-id=036 bgcolor=#d6d6d6
| 124036 ||  || — || March 20, 2001 || Haleakala || NEAT || — || align=right | 7.3 km || 
|-id=037 bgcolor=#d6d6d6
| 124037 ||  || — || March 20, 2001 || Haleakala || NEAT || HYG || align=right | 5.7 km || 
|-id=038 bgcolor=#d6d6d6
| 124038 ||  || — || March 20, 2001 || Haleakala || NEAT || — || align=right | 5.3 km || 
|-id=039 bgcolor=#d6d6d6
| 124039 ||  || — || March 21, 2001 || Anderson Mesa || LONEOS || — || align=right | 8.9 km || 
|-id=040 bgcolor=#d6d6d6
| 124040 ||  || — || March 21, 2001 || Anderson Mesa || LONEOS || — || align=right | 8.8 km || 
|-id=041 bgcolor=#d6d6d6
| 124041 ||  || — || March 21, 2001 || Haleakala || NEAT || — || align=right | 7.9 km || 
|-id=042 bgcolor=#d6d6d6
| 124042 ||  || — || March 21, 2001 || Haleakala || NEAT || THM || align=right | 3.7 km || 
|-id=043 bgcolor=#d6d6d6
| 124043 ||  || — || March 21, 2001 || Haleakala || NEAT || — || align=right | 4.1 km || 
|-id=044 bgcolor=#E9E9E9
| 124044 ||  || — || March 23, 2001 || Anderson Mesa || LONEOS || CLO || align=right | 5.7 km || 
|-id=045 bgcolor=#d6d6d6
| 124045 ||  || — || March 23, 2001 || Anderson Mesa || LONEOS || — || align=right | 6.0 km || 
|-id=046 bgcolor=#d6d6d6
| 124046 ||  || — || March 23, 2001 || Anderson Mesa || LONEOS || — || align=right | 5.9 km || 
|-id=047 bgcolor=#d6d6d6
| 124047 ||  || — || March 23, 2001 || Anderson Mesa || LONEOS || — || align=right | 7.0 km || 
|-id=048 bgcolor=#d6d6d6
| 124048 ||  || — || March 24, 2001 || Anderson Mesa || LONEOS || — || align=right | 6.3 km || 
|-id=049 bgcolor=#d6d6d6
| 124049 ||  || — || March 24, 2001 || Anderson Mesa || LONEOS || — || align=right | 5.7 km || 
|-id=050 bgcolor=#d6d6d6
| 124050 ||  || — || March 24, 2001 || Anderson Mesa || LONEOS || — || align=right | 7.1 km || 
|-id=051 bgcolor=#d6d6d6
| 124051 ||  || — || March 24, 2001 || Anderson Mesa || LONEOS || EOS || align=right | 4.3 km || 
|-id=052 bgcolor=#d6d6d6
| 124052 ||  || — || March 26, 2001 || Socorro || LINEAR || — || align=right | 4.9 km || 
|-id=053 bgcolor=#E9E9E9
| 124053 ||  || — || March 26, 2001 || Socorro || LINEAR || — || align=right | 5.3 km || 
|-id=054 bgcolor=#d6d6d6
| 124054 ||  || — || March 26, 2001 || Haleakala || NEAT || EOS || align=right | 4.6 km || 
|-id=055 bgcolor=#d6d6d6
| 124055 ||  || — || March 29, 2001 || Haleakala || NEAT || — || align=right | 8.2 km || 
|-id=056 bgcolor=#d6d6d6
| 124056 ||  || — || March 29, 2001 || Haleakala || NEAT || — || align=right | 6.0 km || 
|-id=057 bgcolor=#d6d6d6
| 124057 ||  || — || March 30, 2001 || Haleakala || NEAT || — || align=right | 5.2 km || 
|-id=058 bgcolor=#d6d6d6
| 124058 ||  || — || March 18, 2001 || Socorro || LINEAR || — || align=right | 5.4 km || 
|-id=059 bgcolor=#d6d6d6
| 124059 ||  || — || March 19, 2001 || Anderson Mesa || LONEOS || — || align=right | 7.5 km || 
|-id=060 bgcolor=#d6d6d6
| 124060 ||  || — || March 20, 2001 || Kitt Peak || Spacewatch || — || align=right | 4.0 km || 
|-id=061 bgcolor=#d6d6d6
| 124061 ||  || — || March 23, 2001 || Socorro || LINEAR || — || align=right | 5.2 km || 
|-id=062 bgcolor=#d6d6d6
| 124062 ||  || — || March 23, 2001 || Anderson Mesa || LONEOS || THB || align=right | 6.8 km || 
|-id=063 bgcolor=#d6d6d6
| 124063 ||  || — || March 24, 2001 || Socorro || LINEAR || — || align=right | 7.6 km || 
|-id=064 bgcolor=#d6d6d6
| 124064 ||  || — || March 24, 2001 || Haleakala || NEAT || TIR || align=right | 6.2 km || 
|-id=065 bgcolor=#d6d6d6
| 124065 ||  || — || March 25, 2001 || Anderson Mesa || LONEOS || — || align=right | 5.1 km || 
|-id=066 bgcolor=#d6d6d6
| 124066 ||  || — || March 31, 2001 || Socorro || LINEAR || — || align=right | 9.6 km || 
|-id=067 bgcolor=#d6d6d6
| 124067 ||  || — || March 31, 2001 || Socorro || LINEAR || TIR || align=right | 6.7 km || 
|-id=068 bgcolor=#d6d6d6
| 124068 ||  || — || March 16, 2001 || Socorro || LINEAR || — || align=right | 4.6 km || 
|-id=069 bgcolor=#d6d6d6
| 124069 ||  || — || March 16, 2001 || Socorro || LINEAR || — || align=right | 6.5 km || 
|-id=070 bgcolor=#d6d6d6
| 124070 ||  || — || March 16, 2001 || Socorro || LINEAR || — || align=right | 9.4 km || 
|-id=071 bgcolor=#d6d6d6
| 124071 ||  || — || March 26, 2001 || Haleakala || NEAT || VER || align=right | 5.9 km || 
|-id=072 bgcolor=#d6d6d6
| 124072 ||  || — || March 24, 2001 || Anderson Mesa || LONEOS || — || align=right | 9.0 km || 
|-id=073 bgcolor=#d6d6d6
| 124073 ||  || — || April 13, 2001 || Socorro || LINEAR || ALA || align=right | 7.1 km || 
|-id=074 bgcolor=#d6d6d6
| 124074 ||  || — || April 15, 2001 || Kanab || E. E. Sheridan || — || align=right | 5.1 km || 
|-id=075 bgcolor=#d6d6d6
| 124075 Ketelsen ||  ||  || April 15, 2001 || Junk Bond || D. Healy || THM || align=right | 3.5 km || 
|-id=076 bgcolor=#fefefe
| 124076 ||  || — || April 14, 2001 || Socorro || LINEAR || H || align=right | 1.7 km || 
|-id=077 bgcolor=#fefefe
| 124077 ||  || — || April 14, 2001 || Socorro || LINEAR || H || align=right | 1.6 km || 
|-id=078 bgcolor=#fefefe
| 124078 ||  || — || April 14, 2001 || Socorro || LINEAR || H || align=right | 1.8 km || 
|-id=079 bgcolor=#d6d6d6
| 124079 ||  || — || April 14, 2001 || Socorro || LINEAR || EUP || align=right | 6.8 km || 
|-id=080 bgcolor=#fefefe
| 124080 ||  || — || April 14, 2001 || Socorro || LINEAR || H || align=right | 1.5 km || 
|-id=081 bgcolor=#d6d6d6
| 124081 ||  || — || April 15, 2001 || Socorro || LINEAR || — || align=right | 6.5 km || 
|-id=082 bgcolor=#d6d6d6
| 124082 ||  || — || April 15, 2001 || Socorro || LINEAR || ALA || align=right | 8.1 km || 
|-id=083 bgcolor=#fefefe
| 124083 ||  || — || April 15, 2001 || Haleakala || NEAT || — || align=right | 1.8 km || 
|-id=084 bgcolor=#d6d6d6
| 124084 ||  || — || April 17, 2001 || Desert Beaver || W. K. Y. Yeung || THM || align=right | 5.3 km || 
|-id=085 bgcolor=#fefefe
| 124085 ||  || — || April 21, 2001 || Socorro || LINEAR || H || align=right | 1.8 km || 
|-id=086 bgcolor=#d6d6d6
| 124086 ||  || — || April 18, 2001 || Socorro || LINEAR || — || align=right | 5.8 km || 
|-id=087 bgcolor=#d6d6d6
| 124087 ||  || — || April 23, 2001 || Ondřejov || P. Kušnirák, P. Pravec || HYG || align=right | 5.6 km || 
|-id=088 bgcolor=#fefefe
| 124088 ||  || — || April 24, 2001 || Anderson Mesa || LONEOS || H || align=right | 1.0 km || 
|-id=089 bgcolor=#d6d6d6
| 124089 ||  || — || April 21, 2001 || Socorro || LINEAR || EUP || align=right | 7.9 km || 
|-id=090 bgcolor=#d6d6d6
| 124090 ||  || — || April 23, 2001 || Kitt Peak || Spacewatch || — || align=right | 4.2 km || 
|-id=091 bgcolor=#d6d6d6
| 124091 ||  || — || April 27, 2001 || Desert Beaver || W. K. Y. Yeung || — || align=right | 9.4 km || 
|-id=092 bgcolor=#d6d6d6
| 124092 ||  || — || April 23, 2001 || Socorro || LINEAR || — || align=right | 6.1 km || 
|-id=093 bgcolor=#d6d6d6
| 124093 ||  || — || April 27, 2001 || Socorro || LINEAR || — || align=right | 7.0 km || 
|-id=094 bgcolor=#d6d6d6
| 124094 ||  || — || April 27, 2001 || Socorro || LINEAR || HYG || align=right | 5.5 km || 
|-id=095 bgcolor=#d6d6d6
| 124095 ||  || — || April 27, 2001 || Socorro || LINEAR || THM || align=right | 4.7 km || 
|-id=096 bgcolor=#d6d6d6
| 124096 ||  || — || April 27, 2001 || Socorro || LINEAR || — || align=right | 7.2 km || 
|-id=097 bgcolor=#d6d6d6
| 124097 ||  || — || April 27, 2001 || Socorro || LINEAR || LUT || align=right | 10 km || 
|-id=098 bgcolor=#d6d6d6
| 124098 ||  || — || April 27, 2001 || Socorro || LINEAR || — || align=right | 7.0 km || 
|-id=099 bgcolor=#d6d6d6
| 124099 ||  || — || April 27, 2001 || Socorro || LINEAR || — || align=right | 6.2 km || 
|-id=100 bgcolor=#d6d6d6
| 124100 ||  || — || April 30, 2001 || Kitt Peak || Spacewatch || HIL3:2 || align=right | 12 km || 
|}

124101–124200 

|-bgcolor=#d6d6d6
| 124101 ||  || — || April 16, 2001 || Socorro || LINEAR || — || align=right | 6.9 km || 
|-id=102 bgcolor=#d6d6d6
| 124102 ||  || — || April 16, 2001 || Anderson Mesa || LONEOS || — || align=right | 4.5 km || 
|-id=103 bgcolor=#d6d6d6
| 124103 ||  || — || April 16, 2001 || Anderson Mesa || LONEOS || — || align=right | 5.0 km || 
|-id=104 bgcolor=#fefefe
| 124104 Balcony ||  ||  || April 17, 2001 || Saint-Véran || Saint-Véran Obs. || — || align=right | 2.5 km || 
|-id=105 bgcolor=#d6d6d6
| 124105 ||  || — || April 21, 2001 || Socorro || LINEAR || TIR || align=right | 5.1 km || 
|-id=106 bgcolor=#d6d6d6
| 124106 ||  || — || April 21, 2001 || Socorro || LINEAR || EUP || align=right | 6.4 km || 
|-id=107 bgcolor=#d6d6d6
| 124107 ||  || — || April 21, 2001 || Haleakala || NEAT || EUP || align=right | 8.5 km || 
|-id=108 bgcolor=#d6d6d6
| 124108 ||  || — || April 21, 2001 || Haleakala || NEAT || — || align=right | 7.1 km || 
|-id=109 bgcolor=#d6d6d6
| 124109 ||  || — || April 22, 2001 || Socorro || LINEAR || TIR || align=right | 5.0 km || 
|-id=110 bgcolor=#d6d6d6
| 124110 ||  || — || April 23, 2001 || Socorro || LINEAR || — || align=right | 4.9 km || 
|-id=111 bgcolor=#d6d6d6
| 124111 ||  || — || April 23, 2001 || Socorro || LINEAR || HYG || align=right | 5.6 km || 
|-id=112 bgcolor=#fefefe
| 124112 ||  || — || April 24, 2001 || Anderson Mesa || LONEOS || H || align=right data-sort-value="0.87" | 870 m || 
|-id=113 bgcolor=#fefefe
| 124113 ||  || — || April 24, 2001 || Socorro || LINEAR || — || align=right | 1.2 km || 
|-id=114 bgcolor=#d6d6d6
| 124114 Bergersen ||  ||  || April 21, 2001 || Goodricke-Pigott || R. A. Tucker || — || align=right | 8.4 km || 
|-id=115 bgcolor=#fefefe
| 124115 ||  || — || May 15, 2001 || Haleakala || NEAT || — || align=right | 1.1 km || 
|-id=116 bgcolor=#d6d6d6
| 124116 ||  || — || May 14, 2001 || Haleakala || NEAT || — || align=right | 7.0 km || 
|-id=117 bgcolor=#d6d6d6
| 124117 ||  || — || May 15, 2001 || Anderson Mesa || LONEOS || — || align=right | 6.0 km || 
|-id=118 bgcolor=#d6d6d6
| 124118 ||  || — || May 15, 2001 || Anderson Mesa || LONEOS || — || align=right | 8.4 km || 
|-id=119 bgcolor=#d6d6d6
| 124119 ||  || — || May 15, 2001 || Anderson Mesa || LONEOS || EMA || align=right | 6.7 km || 
|-id=120 bgcolor=#FA8072
| 124120 ||  || — || May 18, 2001 || Socorro || LINEAR || — || align=right | 1.3 km || 
|-id=121 bgcolor=#fefefe
| 124121 ||  || — || May 18, 2001 || Socorro || LINEAR || H || align=right | 1.4 km || 
|-id=122 bgcolor=#fefefe
| 124122 ||  || — || May 21, 2001 || Socorro || LINEAR || H || align=right | 1.2 km || 
|-id=123 bgcolor=#d6d6d6
| 124123 ||  || — || May 17, 2001 || Socorro || LINEAR || HYG || align=right | 5.5 km || 
|-id=124 bgcolor=#d6d6d6
| 124124 ||  || — || May 17, 2001 || Socorro || LINEAR || LIX || align=right | 7.5 km || 
|-id=125 bgcolor=#fefefe
| 124125 ||  || — || May 17, 2001 || Socorro || LINEAR || — || align=right | 2.8 km || 
|-id=126 bgcolor=#d6d6d6
| 124126 ||  || — || May 18, 2001 || Socorro || LINEAR || — || align=right | 7.2 km || 
|-id=127 bgcolor=#fefefe
| 124127 ||  || — || May 18, 2001 || Socorro || LINEAR || — || align=right | 1.6 km || 
|-id=128 bgcolor=#d6d6d6
| 124128 ||  || — || May 18, 2001 || Socorro || LINEAR || — || align=right | 6.9 km || 
|-id=129 bgcolor=#d6d6d6
| 124129 ||  || — || May 21, 2001 || Anderson Mesa || LONEOS || HYG || align=right | 4.7 km || 
|-id=130 bgcolor=#fefefe
| 124130 ||  || — || May 22, 2001 || Socorro || LINEAR || — || align=right | 1.4 km || 
|-id=131 bgcolor=#d6d6d6
| 124131 ||  || — || May 21, 2001 || Socorro || LINEAR || — || align=right | 6.5 km || 
|-id=132 bgcolor=#fefefe
| 124132 ||  || — || May 24, 2001 || Socorro || LINEAR || — || align=right | 1.3 km || 
|-id=133 bgcolor=#d6d6d6
| 124133 ||  || — || May 22, 2001 || Anderson Mesa || LONEOS || — || align=right | 5.4 km || 
|-id=134 bgcolor=#fefefe
| 124134 ||  || — || May 24, 2001 || Socorro || LINEAR || — || align=right | 1.5 km || 
|-id=135 bgcolor=#fefefe
| 124135 || 2001 LS || — || June 14, 2001 || Palomar || NEAT || — || align=right | 1.9 km || 
|-id=136 bgcolor=#FA8072
| 124136 ||  || — || June 13, 2001 || Socorro || LINEAR || — || align=right | 1.4 km || 
|-id=137 bgcolor=#fefefe
| 124137 ||  || — || June 15, 2001 || Kitt Peak || Spacewatch || — || align=right | 1.7 km || 
|-id=138 bgcolor=#fefefe
| 124138 ||  || — || June 15, 2001 || Socorro || LINEAR || — || align=right | 1.6 km || 
|-id=139 bgcolor=#fefefe
| 124139 ||  || — || June 15, 2001 || Socorro || LINEAR || — || align=right | 1.7 km || 
|-id=140 bgcolor=#fefefe
| 124140 ||  || — || June 3, 2001 || Haleakala || NEAT || — || align=right | 1.9 km || 
|-id=141 bgcolor=#fefefe
| 124141 ||  || — || June 14, 2001 || Anderson Mesa || LONEOS || H || align=right | 1.6 km || 
|-id=142 bgcolor=#fefefe
| 124142 ||  || — || June 18, 2001 || Socorro || LINEAR || H || align=right | 1.4 km || 
|-id=143 bgcolor=#fefefe
| 124143 Joséluiscorral ||  ||  || June 21, 2001 || Calar Alto || Calar Alto Obs. || NYS || align=right | 1.2 km || 
|-id=144 bgcolor=#fefefe
| 124144 ||  || — || June 20, 2001 || Haleakala || NEAT || — || align=right | 3.2 km || 
|-id=145 bgcolor=#fefefe
| 124145 ||  || — || June 19, 2001 || Haleakala || NEAT || — || align=right | 2.4 km || 
|-id=146 bgcolor=#FA8072
| 124146 ||  || — || June 22, 2001 || Palomar || NEAT || — || align=right | 1.4 km || 
|-id=147 bgcolor=#fefefe
| 124147 ||  || — || June 25, 2001 || Palomar || NEAT || — || align=right | 1.3 km || 
|-id=148 bgcolor=#fefefe
| 124148 ||  || — || June 25, 2001 || Palomar || NEAT || FLO || align=right | 1.1 km || 
|-id=149 bgcolor=#fefefe
| 124149 ||  || — || June 28, 2001 || Haleakala || NEAT || — || align=right | 1.7 km || 
|-id=150 bgcolor=#fefefe
| 124150 ||  || — || July 13, 2001 || Palomar || NEAT || — || align=right | 1.8 km || 
|-id=151 bgcolor=#fefefe
| 124151 ||  || — || July 13, 2001 || Palomar || NEAT || — || align=right | 1.5 km || 
|-id=152 bgcolor=#fefefe
| 124152 ||  || — || July 14, 2001 || Palomar || NEAT || — || align=right | 1.9 km || 
|-id=153 bgcolor=#fefefe
| 124153 ||  || — || July 13, 2001 || Palomar || NEAT || — || align=right | 1.3 km || 
|-id=154 bgcolor=#d6d6d6
| 124154 ||  || — || July 12, 2001 || Palomar || NEAT || — || align=right | 5.6 km || 
|-id=155 bgcolor=#fefefe
| 124155 ||  || — || July 12, 2001 || Haleakala || NEAT || — || align=right | 1.3 km || 
|-id=156 bgcolor=#fefefe
| 124156 ||  || — || July 14, 2001 || Palomar || NEAT || — || align=right | 1.7 km || 
|-id=157 bgcolor=#fefefe
| 124157 ||  || — || July 14, 2001 || Palomar || NEAT || NYS || align=right | 2.7 km || 
|-id=158 bgcolor=#FA8072
| 124158 ||  || — || July 17, 2001 || Anderson Mesa || LONEOS || — || align=right | 1.7 km || 
|-id=159 bgcolor=#fefefe
| 124159 ||  || — || July 18, 2001 || Palomar || NEAT || — || align=right | 1.5 km || 
|-id=160 bgcolor=#fefefe
| 124160 ||  || — || July 17, 2001 || Anderson Mesa || LONEOS || — || align=right | 2.2 km || 
|-id=161 bgcolor=#fefefe
| 124161 ||  || — || July 20, 2001 || Palomar || NEAT || — || align=right | 3.5 km || 
|-id=162 bgcolor=#FA8072
| 124162 ||  || — || July 20, 2001 || Socorro || LINEAR || — || align=right | 1.4 km || 
|-id=163 bgcolor=#fefefe
| 124163 ||  || — || July 20, 2001 || Socorro || LINEAR || — || align=right | 2.1 km || 
|-id=164 bgcolor=#fefefe
| 124164 ||  || — || July 18, 2001 || Palomar || NEAT || — || align=right data-sort-value="0.96" | 960 m || 
|-id=165 bgcolor=#FA8072
| 124165 ||  || — || July 21, 2001 || Palomar || NEAT || — || align=right | 1.9 km || 
|-id=166 bgcolor=#fefefe
| 124166 ||  || — || July 17, 2001 || Haleakala || NEAT || — || align=right | 1.4 km || 
|-id=167 bgcolor=#fefefe
| 124167 ||  || — || July 17, 2001 || Haleakala || NEAT || FLO || align=right | 1.2 km || 
|-id=168 bgcolor=#fefefe
| 124168 ||  || — || July 17, 2001 || Haleakala || NEAT || V || align=right data-sort-value="0.97" | 970 m || 
|-id=169 bgcolor=#fefefe
| 124169 ||  || — || July 21, 2001 || Anderson Mesa || LONEOS || NYS || align=right | 1.4 km || 
|-id=170 bgcolor=#fefefe
| 124170 ||  || — || July 21, 2001 || Anderson Mesa || LONEOS || — || align=right | 1.8 km || 
|-id=171 bgcolor=#fefefe
| 124171 ||  || — || July 21, 2001 || Anderson Mesa || LONEOS || — || align=right | 1.9 km || 
|-id=172 bgcolor=#FA8072
| 124172 ||  || — || July 16, 2001 || Anderson Mesa || LONEOS || — || align=right | 1.5 km || 
|-id=173 bgcolor=#fefefe
| 124173 ||  || — || July 16, 2001 || Anderson Mesa || LONEOS || FLO || align=right | 1.1 km || 
|-id=174 bgcolor=#d6d6d6
| 124174 ||  || — || July 16, 2001 || Anderson Mesa || LONEOS || SHU3:2 || align=right | 12 km || 
|-id=175 bgcolor=#fefefe
| 124175 ||  || — || July 19, 2001 || Haleakala || NEAT || FLO || align=right | 1.3 km || 
|-id=176 bgcolor=#fefefe
| 124176 ||  || — || July 24, 2001 || Prescott || P. G. Comba || FLO || align=right | 1.4 km || 
|-id=177 bgcolor=#fefefe
| 124177 ||  || — || July 20, 2001 || Palomar || NEAT || V || align=right data-sort-value="0.97" | 970 m || 
|-id=178 bgcolor=#fefefe
| 124178 ||  || — || July 20, 2001 || Palomar || NEAT || — || align=right | 1.6 km || 
|-id=179 bgcolor=#fefefe
| 124179 ||  || — || July 16, 2001 || Anderson Mesa || LONEOS || V || align=right | 1.2 km || 
|-id=180 bgcolor=#fefefe
| 124180 ||  || — || July 16, 2001 || Anderson Mesa || LONEOS || — || align=right | 1.5 km || 
|-id=181 bgcolor=#fefefe
| 124181 ||  || — || July 16, 2001 || Anderson Mesa || LONEOS || V || align=right | 1.3 km || 
|-id=182 bgcolor=#fefefe
| 124182 ||  || — || July 19, 2001 || Haleakala || NEAT || FLO || align=right | 1.0 km || 
|-id=183 bgcolor=#fefefe
| 124183 ||  || — || July 21, 2001 || Palomar || NEAT || — || align=right | 1.5 km || 
|-id=184 bgcolor=#fefefe
| 124184 ||  || — || July 22, 2001 || Palomar || NEAT || FLO || align=right | 1.4 km || 
|-id=185 bgcolor=#fefefe
| 124185 ||  || — || July 26, 2001 || Palomar || NEAT || V || align=right | 1.6 km || 
|-id=186 bgcolor=#fefefe
| 124186 ||  || — || July 16, 2001 || Anderson Mesa || LONEOS || FLO || align=right | 1.3 km || 
|-id=187 bgcolor=#fefefe
| 124187 ||  || — || July 21, 2001 || Haleakala || NEAT || — || align=right | 1.6 km || 
|-id=188 bgcolor=#fefefe
| 124188 ||  || — || July 21, 2001 || Haleakala || NEAT || — || align=right | 1.1 km || 
|-id=189 bgcolor=#fefefe
| 124189 ||  || — || July 21, 2001 || Haleakala || NEAT || FLO || align=right | 1.2 km || 
|-id=190 bgcolor=#fefefe
| 124190 ||  || — || July 27, 2001 || Anderson Mesa || LONEOS || FLO || align=right | 1.1 km || 
|-id=191 bgcolor=#fefefe
| 124191 ||  || — || July 19, 2001 || Haleakala || NEAT || FLO || align=right | 1.2 km || 
|-id=192 bgcolor=#FA8072
| 124192 Moletai ||  ||  || July 26, 2001 || Moletai || K. Černis, V. Laugalys || — || align=right | 1.4 km || 
|-id=193 bgcolor=#fefefe
| 124193 ||  || — || July 16, 2001 || Haleakala || NEAT || V || align=right | 1.5 km || 
|-id=194 bgcolor=#fefefe
| 124194 ||  || — || July 21, 2001 || Anderson Mesa || LONEOS || FLO || align=right | 1.6 km || 
|-id=195 bgcolor=#fefefe
| 124195 ||  || — || July 21, 2001 || Anderson Mesa || LONEOS || — || align=right | 1.4 km || 
|-id=196 bgcolor=#fefefe
| 124196 ||  || — || July 21, 2001 || Kitt Peak || Spacewatch || V || align=right | 1.4 km || 
|-id=197 bgcolor=#fefefe
| 124197 ||  || — || July 29, 2001 || Socorro || LINEAR || PHO || align=right | 2.5 km || 
|-id=198 bgcolor=#fefefe
| 124198 ||  || — || July 18, 2001 || Mauna Kea || D. J. Tholen || — || align=right | 2.1 km || 
|-id=199 bgcolor=#fefefe
| 124199 ||  || — || July 26, 2001 || Palomar || NEAT || FLO || align=right | 2.5 km || 
|-id=200 bgcolor=#FA8072
| 124200 ||  || — || July 28, 2001 || Anderson Mesa || LONEOS || — || align=right | 2.5 km || 
|}

124201–124300 

|-bgcolor=#fefefe
| 124201 ||  || — || July 20, 2001 || Anderson Mesa || LONEOS || — || align=right | 1.5 km || 
|-id=202 bgcolor=#fefefe
| 124202 ||  || — || July 20, 2001 || Socorro || LINEAR || — || align=right | 1.8 km || 
|-id=203 bgcolor=#fefefe
| 124203 ||  || — || July 28, 2001 || Haleakala || NEAT || NYS || align=right | 1.1 km || 
|-id=204 bgcolor=#fefefe
| 124204 ||  || — || July 22, 2001 || Palomar || NEAT || — || align=right | 1.4 km || 
|-id=205 bgcolor=#fefefe
| 124205 ||  || — || July 27, 2001 || Anderson Mesa || LONEOS || — || align=right | 1.4 km || 
|-id=206 bgcolor=#fefefe
| 124206 ||  || — || July 27, 2001 || Bergisch Gladbach || W. Bickel || — || align=right | 1.1 km || 
|-id=207 bgcolor=#fefefe
| 124207 ||  || — || July 25, 2001 || Haleakala || NEAT || NYS || align=right | 1.2 km || 
|-id=208 bgcolor=#fefefe
| 124208 ||  || — || July 25, 2001 || Haleakala || NEAT || V || align=right | 1.5 km || 
|-id=209 bgcolor=#fefefe
| 124209 ||  || — || July 25, 2001 || Haleakala || NEAT || — || align=right | 1.4 km || 
|-id=210 bgcolor=#fefefe
| 124210 ||  || — || July 27, 2001 || Anderson Mesa || LONEOS || FLO || align=right | 1.3 km || 
|-id=211 bgcolor=#fefefe
| 124211 ||  || — || July 27, 2001 || Haleakala || NEAT || FLO || align=right | 1.1 km || 
|-id=212 bgcolor=#fefefe
| 124212 ||  || — || July 28, 2001 || Haleakala || NEAT || — || align=right | 1.3 km || 
|-id=213 bgcolor=#fefefe
| 124213 ||  || — || July 29, 2001 || Socorro || LINEAR || — || align=right | 1.4 km || 
|-id=214 bgcolor=#fefefe
| 124214 ||  || — || July 19, 2001 || Palomar || NEAT || V || align=right | 1.3 km || 
|-id=215 bgcolor=#fefefe
| 124215 ||  || — || July 25, 2001 || Haleakala || NEAT || — || align=right | 1.3 km || 
|-id=216 bgcolor=#fefefe
| 124216 ||  || — || August 7, 2001 || Haleakala || NEAT || — || align=right | 1.3 km || 
|-id=217 bgcolor=#fefefe
| 124217 ||  || — || August 10, 2001 || Haleakala || NEAT || FLO || align=right | 1.1 km || 
|-id=218 bgcolor=#fefefe
| 124218 ||  || — || August 10, 2001 || Haleakala || NEAT || FLO || align=right | 1.5 km || 
|-id=219 bgcolor=#fefefe
| 124219 ||  || — || August 10, 2001 || Haleakala || NEAT || NYS || align=right | 2.4 km || 
|-id=220 bgcolor=#fefefe
| 124220 ||  || — || August 10, 2001 || Haleakala || NEAT || MAS || align=right | 1.2 km || 
|-id=221 bgcolor=#fefefe
| 124221 ||  || — || August 8, 2001 || Haleakala || NEAT || FLO || align=right | 1.3 km || 
|-id=222 bgcolor=#fefefe
| 124222 ||  || — || August 8, 2001 || Haleakala || NEAT || FLO || align=right | 1.2 km || 
|-id=223 bgcolor=#fefefe
| 124223 ||  || — || August 12, 2001 || Palomar || NEAT || — || align=right | 1.9 km || 
|-id=224 bgcolor=#d6d6d6
| 124224 ||  || — || August 9, 2001 || Palomar || NEAT || 7:4 || align=right | 9.1 km || 
|-id=225 bgcolor=#fefefe
| 124225 ||  || — || August 10, 2001 || Palomar || NEAT || KLI || align=right | 2.2 km || 
|-id=226 bgcolor=#fefefe
| 124226 ||  || — || August 10, 2001 || Haleakala || NEAT || — || align=right | 2.6 km || 
|-id=227 bgcolor=#fefefe
| 124227 ||  || — || August 10, 2001 || Haleakala || NEAT || V || align=right | 1.1 km || 
|-id=228 bgcolor=#fefefe
| 124228 ||  || — || August 11, 2001 || Haleakala || NEAT || — || align=right | 1.3 km || 
|-id=229 bgcolor=#fefefe
| 124229 ||  || — || August 11, 2001 || Haleakala || NEAT || NYS || align=right | 1.1 km || 
|-id=230 bgcolor=#fefefe
| 124230 ||  || — || August 11, 2001 || Haleakala || NEAT || FLO || align=right data-sort-value="0.94" | 940 m || 
|-id=231 bgcolor=#fefefe
| 124231 ||  || — || August 11, 2001 || Haleakala || NEAT || FLO || align=right | 1.4 km || 
|-id=232 bgcolor=#fefefe
| 124232 ||  || — || August 11, 2001 || Haleakala || NEAT || NYS || align=right | 1.2 km || 
|-id=233 bgcolor=#fefefe
| 124233 ||  || — || August 11, 2001 || Palomar || NEAT || — || align=right | 1.7 km || 
|-id=234 bgcolor=#fefefe
| 124234 ||  || — || August 11, 2001 || Haleakala || NEAT || — || align=right | 1.5 km || 
|-id=235 bgcolor=#fefefe
| 124235 ||  || — || August 11, 2001 || Palomar || NEAT || V || align=right | 1.6 km || 
|-id=236 bgcolor=#fefefe
| 124236 ||  || — || August 15, 2001 || Haleakala || NEAT || — || align=right | 1.1 km || 
|-id=237 bgcolor=#fefefe
| 124237 ||  || — || August 11, 2001 || Haleakala || NEAT || — || align=right | 1.7 km || 
|-id=238 bgcolor=#E9E9E9
| 124238 ||  || — || August 12, 2001 || Palomar || NEAT || — || align=right | 2.0 km || 
|-id=239 bgcolor=#fefefe
| 124239 ||  || — || August 12, 2001 || Palomar || NEAT || — || align=right | 1.5 km || 
|-id=240 bgcolor=#fefefe
| 124240 ||  || — || August 14, 2001 || Palomar || NEAT || V || align=right | 1.2 km || 
|-id=241 bgcolor=#fefefe
| 124241 ||  || — || August 15, 2001 || Haleakala || NEAT || — || align=right | 1.2 km || 
|-id=242 bgcolor=#fefefe
| 124242 ||  || — || August 14, 2001 || Haleakala || NEAT || V || align=right | 1.3 km || 
|-id=243 bgcolor=#fefefe
| 124243 ||  || — || August 13, 2001 || Haleakala || NEAT || — || align=right | 1.3 km || 
|-id=244 bgcolor=#fefefe
| 124244 ||  || — || August 13, 2001 || Haleakala || NEAT || FLO || align=right | 1.4 km || 
|-id=245 bgcolor=#fefefe
| 124245 ||  || — || August 13, 2001 || Haleakala || NEAT || NYS || align=right | 1.4 km || 
|-id=246 bgcolor=#fefefe
| 124246 ||  || — || August 15, 2001 || Haleakala || NEAT || — || align=right | 1.2 km || 
|-id=247 bgcolor=#fefefe
| 124247 ||  || — || August 16, 2001 || Socorro || LINEAR || V || align=right | 1.3 km || 
|-id=248 bgcolor=#fefefe
| 124248 ||  || — || August 16, 2001 || Socorro || LINEAR || FLO || align=right | 1.2 km || 
|-id=249 bgcolor=#fefefe
| 124249 ||  || — || August 16, 2001 || Socorro || LINEAR || NYS || align=right | 1.4 km || 
|-id=250 bgcolor=#fefefe
| 124250 ||  || — || August 16, 2001 || Socorro || LINEAR || — || align=right | 1.4 km || 
|-id=251 bgcolor=#fefefe
| 124251 ||  || — || August 16, 2001 || Socorro || LINEAR || — || align=right | 3.2 km || 
|-id=252 bgcolor=#fefefe
| 124252 ||  || — || August 16, 2001 || Socorro || LINEAR || NYS || align=right | 1.1 km || 
|-id=253 bgcolor=#fefefe
| 124253 ||  || — || August 16, 2001 || Socorro || LINEAR || — || align=right | 1.3 km || 
|-id=254 bgcolor=#fefefe
| 124254 ||  || — || August 16, 2001 || Socorro || LINEAR || ERI || align=right | 2.4 km || 
|-id=255 bgcolor=#fefefe
| 124255 ||  || — || August 16, 2001 || Socorro || LINEAR || — || align=right | 1.3 km || 
|-id=256 bgcolor=#fefefe
| 124256 ||  || — || August 16, 2001 || Socorro || LINEAR || — || align=right | 1.2 km || 
|-id=257 bgcolor=#fefefe
| 124257 ||  || — || August 16, 2001 || Socorro || LINEAR || NYS || align=right | 1.4 km || 
|-id=258 bgcolor=#fefefe
| 124258 ||  || — || August 16, 2001 || Socorro || LINEAR || — || align=right | 1.9 km || 
|-id=259 bgcolor=#fefefe
| 124259 ||  || — || August 16, 2001 || Socorro || LINEAR || — || align=right | 1.3 km || 
|-id=260 bgcolor=#fefefe
| 124260 ||  || — || August 16, 2001 || Socorro || LINEAR || — || align=right | 1.7 km || 
|-id=261 bgcolor=#fefefe
| 124261 ||  || — || August 16, 2001 || Socorro || LINEAR || — || align=right | 1.5 km || 
|-id=262 bgcolor=#fefefe
| 124262 ||  || — || August 16, 2001 || Socorro || LINEAR || NYS || align=right | 1.2 km || 
|-id=263 bgcolor=#fefefe
| 124263 ||  || — || August 16, 2001 || Socorro || LINEAR || — || align=right | 1.7 km || 
|-id=264 bgcolor=#fefefe
| 124264 ||  || — || August 16, 2001 || Socorro || LINEAR || — || align=right | 1.4 km || 
|-id=265 bgcolor=#fefefe
| 124265 ||  || — || August 16, 2001 || Socorro || LINEAR || MAS || align=right | 1.3 km || 
|-id=266 bgcolor=#fefefe
| 124266 ||  || — || August 16, 2001 || Socorro || LINEAR || — || align=right | 1.0 km || 
|-id=267 bgcolor=#fefefe
| 124267 ||  || — || August 16, 2001 || Socorro || LINEAR || — || align=right | 1.6 km || 
|-id=268 bgcolor=#fefefe
| 124268 ||  || — || August 16, 2001 || Socorro || LINEAR || V || align=right | 1.1 km || 
|-id=269 bgcolor=#d6d6d6
| 124269 ||  || — || August 16, 2001 || Socorro || LINEAR || HIL3:2 || align=right | 12 km || 
|-id=270 bgcolor=#fefefe
| 124270 ||  || — || August 16, 2001 || Socorro || LINEAR || NYS || align=right | 1.7 km || 
|-id=271 bgcolor=#fefefe
| 124271 ||  || — || August 16, 2001 || Socorro || LINEAR || — || align=right | 4.0 km || 
|-id=272 bgcolor=#fefefe
| 124272 ||  || — || August 16, 2001 || Socorro || LINEAR || MAS || align=right | 1.2 km || 
|-id=273 bgcolor=#fefefe
| 124273 ||  || — || August 16, 2001 || Socorro || LINEAR || NYS || align=right | 1.2 km || 
|-id=274 bgcolor=#fefefe
| 124274 ||  || — || August 16, 2001 || Socorro || LINEAR || — || align=right | 1.4 km || 
|-id=275 bgcolor=#fefefe
| 124275 ||  || — || August 16, 2001 || Socorro || LINEAR || — || align=right | 1.4 km || 
|-id=276 bgcolor=#fefefe
| 124276 ||  || — || August 16, 2001 || Socorro || LINEAR || — || align=right data-sort-value="0.80" | 800 m || 
|-id=277 bgcolor=#fefefe
| 124277 ||  || — || August 16, 2001 || Socorro || LINEAR || FLO || align=right | 1.6 km || 
|-id=278 bgcolor=#fefefe
| 124278 ||  || — || August 16, 2001 || Socorro || LINEAR || NYS || align=right | 1.4 km || 
|-id=279 bgcolor=#fefefe
| 124279 ||  || — || August 16, 2001 || Socorro || LINEAR || NYS || align=right | 1.8 km || 
|-id=280 bgcolor=#fefefe
| 124280 ||  || — || August 16, 2001 || Socorro || LINEAR || — || align=right | 1.9 km || 
|-id=281 bgcolor=#fefefe
| 124281 ||  || — || August 17, 2001 || Palomar || NEAT || — || align=right | 1.6 km || 
|-id=282 bgcolor=#fefefe
| 124282 ||  || — || August 16, 2001 || Socorro || LINEAR || FLO || align=right | 1.1 km || 
|-id=283 bgcolor=#fefefe
| 124283 ||  || — || August 16, 2001 || Socorro || LINEAR || — || align=right | 1.0 km || 
|-id=284 bgcolor=#fefefe
| 124284 ||  || — || August 16, 2001 || Socorro || LINEAR || MAS || align=right | 1.3 km || 
|-id=285 bgcolor=#fefefe
| 124285 ||  || — || August 16, 2001 || Socorro || LINEAR || — || align=right | 1.2 km || 
|-id=286 bgcolor=#fefefe
| 124286 ||  || — || August 16, 2001 || Socorro || LINEAR || — || align=right | 1.3 km || 
|-id=287 bgcolor=#fefefe
| 124287 ||  || — || August 16, 2001 || Socorro || LINEAR || — || align=right | 1.4 km || 
|-id=288 bgcolor=#fefefe
| 124288 ||  || — || August 16, 2001 || Socorro || LINEAR || NYS || align=right | 1.4 km || 
|-id=289 bgcolor=#fefefe
| 124289 ||  || — || August 16, 2001 || Socorro || LINEAR || FLO || align=right | 1.3 km || 
|-id=290 bgcolor=#fefefe
| 124290 ||  || — || August 16, 2001 || Socorro || LINEAR || — || align=right | 1.4 km || 
|-id=291 bgcolor=#fefefe
| 124291 ||  || — || August 16, 2001 || Socorro || LINEAR || FLO || align=right | 1.2 km || 
|-id=292 bgcolor=#fefefe
| 124292 ||  || — || August 16, 2001 || Socorro || LINEAR || MAS || align=right | 1.4 km || 
|-id=293 bgcolor=#fefefe
| 124293 ||  || — || August 16, 2001 || Socorro || LINEAR || — || align=right | 1.4 km || 
|-id=294 bgcolor=#fefefe
| 124294 ||  || — || August 16, 2001 || Socorro || LINEAR || FLO || align=right | 1.1 km || 
|-id=295 bgcolor=#fefefe
| 124295 ||  || — || August 16, 2001 || Socorro || LINEAR || — || align=right | 1.7 km || 
|-id=296 bgcolor=#fefefe
| 124296 ||  || — || August 16, 2001 || Socorro || LINEAR || NYS || align=right data-sort-value="0.74" | 740 m || 
|-id=297 bgcolor=#fefefe
| 124297 ||  || — || August 16, 2001 || Socorro || LINEAR || V || align=right | 1.3 km || 
|-id=298 bgcolor=#fefefe
| 124298 ||  || — || August 16, 2001 || Socorro || LINEAR || — || align=right | 1.3 km || 
|-id=299 bgcolor=#fefefe
| 124299 ||  || — || August 16, 2001 || Socorro || LINEAR || — || align=right | 1.4 km || 
|-id=300 bgcolor=#fefefe
| 124300 ||  || — || August 18, 2001 || Socorro || LINEAR || — || align=right | 1.7 km || 
|}

124301–124400 

|-bgcolor=#fefefe
| 124301 ||  || — || August 16, 2001 || Socorro || LINEAR || — || align=right | 2.0 km || 
|-id=302 bgcolor=#fefefe
| 124302 ||  || — || August 16, 2001 || Socorro || LINEAR || NYS || align=right | 1.1 km || 
|-id=303 bgcolor=#fefefe
| 124303 ||  || — || August 16, 2001 || Socorro || LINEAR || — || align=right | 1.3 km || 
|-id=304 bgcolor=#fefefe
| 124304 ||  || — || August 16, 2001 || Socorro || LINEAR || — || align=right | 2.0 km || 
|-id=305 bgcolor=#fefefe
| 124305 ||  || — || August 16, 2001 || Socorro || LINEAR || — || align=right | 1.3 km || 
|-id=306 bgcolor=#fefefe
| 124306 ||  || — || August 16, 2001 || Socorro || LINEAR || — || align=right | 2.0 km || 
|-id=307 bgcolor=#fefefe
| 124307 ||  || — || August 16, 2001 || Socorro || LINEAR || V || align=right | 1.6 km || 
|-id=308 bgcolor=#fefefe
| 124308 ||  || — || August 17, 2001 || Socorro || LINEAR || FLO || align=right | 2.3 km || 
|-id=309 bgcolor=#fefefe
| 124309 ||  || — || August 17, 2001 || Socorro || LINEAR || FLO || align=right | 1.5 km || 
|-id=310 bgcolor=#fefefe
| 124310 ||  || — || August 18, 2001 || Palomar || NEAT || — || align=right | 3.4 km || 
|-id=311 bgcolor=#FA8072
| 124311 ||  || — || August 21, 2001 || Ametlla de Mar || J. Nomen || — || align=right | 1.6 km || 
|-id=312 bgcolor=#fefefe
| 124312 ||  || — || August 16, 2001 || Socorro || LINEAR || NYS || align=right | 1.4 km || 
|-id=313 bgcolor=#fefefe
| 124313 ||  || — || August 16, 2001 || Socorro || LINEAR || NYS || align=right | 1.4 km || 
|-id=314 bgcolor=#fefefe
| 124314 ||  || — || August 16, 2001 || Socorro || LINEAR || NYS || align=right | 1.7 km || 
|-id=315 bgcolor=#fefefe
| 124315 ||  || — || August 16, 2001 || Socorro || LINEAR || — || align=right | 1.8 km || 
|-id=316 bgcolor=#fefefe
| 124316 ||  || — || August 16, 2001 || Socorro || LINEAR || — || align=right | 2.0 km || 
|-id=317 bgcolor=#fefefe
| 124317 ||  || — || August 17, 2001 || Socorro || LINEAR || V || align=right | 1.4 km || 
|-id=318 bgcolor=#fefefe
| 124318 ||  || — || August 17, 2001 || Socorro || LINEAR || — || align=right | 1.8 km || 
|-id=319 bgcolor=#fefefe
| 124319 ||  || — || August 17, 2001 || Socorro || LINEAR || V || align=right | 1.8 km || 
|-id=320 bgcolor=#fefefe
| 124320 ||  || — || August 19, 2001 || Socorro || LINEAR || NYS || align=right data-sort-value="0.81" | 810 m || 
|-id=321 bgcolor=#fefefe
| 124321 ||  || — || August 19, 2001 || Socorro || LINEAR || — || align=right | 1.8 km || 
|-id=322 bgcolor=#fefefe
| 124322 ||  || — || August 20, 2001 || Socorro || LINEAR || H || align=right | 1.2 km || 
|-id=323 bgcolor=#fefefe
| 124323 ||  || — || August 23, 2001 || Desert Eagle || W. K. Y. Yeung || NYS || align=right | 3.0 km || 
|-id=324 bgcolor=#fefefe
| 124324 ||  || — || August 16, 2001 || Socorro || LINEAR || — || align=right | 1.3 km || 
|-id=325 bgcolor=#fefefe
| 124325 ||  || — || August 17, 2001 || Socorro || LINEAR || FLO || align=right | 2.7 km || 
|-id=326 bgcolor=#fefefe
| 124326 ||  || — || August 17, 2001 || Socorro || LINEAR || — || align=right | 1.7 km || 
|-id=327 bgcolor=#fefefe
| 124327 ||  || — || August 17, 2001 || Socorro || LINEAR || — || align=right | 1.9 km || 
|-id=328 bgcolor=#E9E9E9
| 124328 ||  || — || August 20, 2001 || Socorro || LINEAR || — || align=right | 1.6 km || 
|-id=329 bgcolor=#FA8072
| 124329 ||  || — || August 20, 2001 || Socorro || LINEAR || — || align=right | 1.9 km || 
|-id=330 bgcolor=#fefefe
| 124330 ||  || — || August 18, 2001 || Socorro || LINEAR || — || align=right | 1.5 km || 
|-id=331 bgcolor=#fefefe
| 124331 ||  || — || August 19, 2001 || Socorro || LINEAR || NYS || align=right | 1.2 km || 
|-id=332 bgcolor=#fefefe
| 124332 ||  || — || August 20, 2001 || Socorro || LINEAR || — || align=right | 1.4 km || 
|-id=333 bgcolor=#fefefe
| 124333 ||  || — || August 23, 2001 || Socorro || LINEAR || — || align=right | 1.8 km || 
|-id=334 bgcolor=#fefefe
| 124334 ||  || — || August 25, 2001 || Anderson Mesa || LONEOS || EUT || align=right | 1.1 km || 
|-id=335 bgcolor=#fefefe
| 124335 ||  || — || August 24, 2001 || Desert Eagle || W. K. Y. Yeung || NYS || align=right | 1.0 km || 
|-id=336 bgcolor=#fefefe
| 124336 ||  || — || August 21, 2001 || Haleakala || NEAT || FLO || align=right | 1.1 km || 
|-id=337 bgcolor=#fefefe
| 124337 ||  || — || August 21, 2001 || Haleakala || NEAT || — || align=right | 1.7 km || 
|-id=338 bgcolor=#fefefe
| 124338 ||  || — || August 24, 2001 || Palomar || NEAT || — || align=right | 1.3 km || 
|-id=339 bgcolor=#fefefe
| 124339 ||  || — || August 22, 2001 || Socorro || LINEAR || — || align=right | 2.0 km || 
|-id=340 bgcolor=#fefefe
| 124340 ||  || — || August 25, 2001 || Socorro || LINEAR || — || align=right | 1.2 km || 
|-id=341 bgcolor=#fefefe
| 124341 ||  || — || August 17, 2001 || Socorro || LINEAR || V || align=right | 1.2 km || 
|-id=342 bgcolor=#fefefe
| 124342 ||  || — || August 17, 2001 || Socorro || LINEAR || V || align=right | 1.2 km || 
|-id=343 bgcolor=#fefefe
| 124343 ||  || — || August 17, 2001 || Socorro || LINEAR || — || align=right | 1.7 km || 
|-id=344 bgcolor=#fefefe
| 124344 ||  || — || August 17, 2001 || Socorro || LINEAR || — || align=right | 1.9 km || 
|-id=345 bgcolor=#fefefe
| 124345 ||  || — || August 17, 2001 || Socorro || LINEAR || — || align=right | 1.8 km || 
|-id=346 bgcolor=#fefefe
| 124346 ||  || — || August 17, 2001 || Socorro || LINEAR || V || align=right | 1.2 km || 
|-id=347 bgcolor=#fefefe
| 124347 ||  || — || August 18, 2001 || Socorro || LINEAR || — || align=right | 1.7 km || 
|-id=348 bgcolor=#fefefe
| 124348 ||  || — || August 18, 2001 || Socorro || LINEAR || FLO || align=right | 1.5 km || 
|-id=349 bgcolor=#fefefe
| 124349 ||  || — || August 19, 2001 || Socorro || LINEAR || — || align=right | 1.7 km || 
|-id=350 bgcolor=#fefefe
| 124350 ||  || — || August 19, 2001 || Socorro || LINEAR || — || align=right | 1.3 km || 
|-id=351 bgcolor=#fefefe
| 124351 ||  || — || August 19, 2001 || Socorro || LINEAR || — || align=right | 2.0 km || 
|-id=352 bgcolor=#fefefe
| 124352 ||  || — || August 20, 2001 || Socorro || LINEAR || — || align=right | 1.7 km || 
|-id=353 bgcolor=#fefefe
| 124353 ||  || — || August 20, 2001 || Socorro || LINEAR || V || align=right | 1.1 km || 
|-id=354 bgcolor=#fefefe
| 124354 ||  || — || August 20, 2001 || Socorro || LINEAR || V || align=right | 1.2 km || 
|-id=355 bgcolor=#fefefe
| 124355 ||  || — || August 20, 2001 || Socorro || LINEAR || — || align=right | 1.6 km || 
|-id=356 bgcolor=#fefefe
| 124356 ||  || — || August 20, 2001 || Socorro || LINEAR || — || align=right | 1.7 km || 
|-id=357 bgcolor=#FA8072
| 124357 ||  || — || August 20, 2001 || Socorro || LINEAR || PHO || align=right | 2.0 km || 
|-id=358 bgcolor=#fefefe
| 124358 ||  || — || August 20, 2001 || Socorro || LINEAR || V || align=right | 1.4 km || 
|-id=359 bgcolor=#fefefe
| 124359 ||  || — || August 20, 2001 || Socorro || LINEAR || V || align=right | 1.1 km || 
|-id=360 bgcolor=#fefefe
| 124360 ||  || — || August 21, 2001 || Socorro || LINEAR || — || align=right | 1.9 km || 
|-id=361 bgcolor=#fefefe
| 124361 ||  || — || August 21, 2001 || Socorro || LINEAR || — || align=right | 2.3 km || 
|-id=362 bgcolor=#fefefe
| 124362 ||  || — || August 22, 2001 || Socorro || LINEAR || V || align=right | 1.4 km || 
|-id=363 bgcolor=#fefefe
| 124363 ||  || — || August 22, 2001 || Socorro || LINEAR || — || align=right | 4.4 km || 
|-id=364 bgcolor=#fefefe
| 124364 ||  || — || August 22, 2001 || Socorro || LINEAR || ERI || align=right | 3.2 km || 
|-id=365 bgcolor=#fefefe
| 124365 ||  || — || August 22, 2001 || Socorro || LINEAR || V || align=right | 1.5 km || 
|-id=366 bgcolor=#fefefe
| 124366 ||  || — || August 22, 2001 || Socorro || LINEAR || — || align=right | 2.1 km || 
|-id=367 bgcolor=#fefefe
| 124367 ||  || — || August 24, 2001 || Socorro || LINEAR || NYS || align=right | 1.6 km || 
|-id=368 bgcolor=#fefefe
| 124368 Nickphoenix ||  ||  || August 24, 2001 || Goodricke-Pigott || R. A. Tucker || FLO || align=right | 1.6 km || 
|-id=369 bgcolor=#fefefe
| 124369 ||  || — || August 20, 2001 || Palomar || NEAT || — || align=right | 2.2 km || 
|-id=370 bgcolor=#fefefe
| 124370 ||  || — || August 25, 2001 || Palomar || NEAT || — || align=right | 2.0 km || 
|-id=371 bgcolor=#fefefe
| 124371 ||  || — || August 25, 2001 || Desert Eagle || W. K. Y. Yeung || — || align=right | 1.6 km || 
|-id=372 bgcolor=#fefefe
| 124372 ||  || — || August 26, 2001 || Desert Eagle || W. K. Y. Yeung || NYS || align=right | 1.5 km || 
|-id=373 bgcolor=#fefefe
| 124373 ||  || — || August 26, 2001 || Desert Eagle || W. K. Y. Yeung || — || align=right | 1.6 km || 
|-id=374 bgcolor=#fefefe
| 124374 ||  || — || August 26, 2001 || Desert Eagle || W. K. Y. Yeung || FLO || align=right | 2.0 km || 
|-id=375 bgcolor=#fefefe
| 124375 ||  || — || August 26, 2001 || Desert Eagle || W. K. Y. Yeung || — || align=right | 1.5 km || 
|-id=376 bgcolor=#fefefe
| 124376 ||  || — || August 23, 2001 || Anderson Mesa || LONEOS || — || align=right | 1.5 km || 
|-id=377 bgcolor=#fefefe
| 124377 ||  || — || August 23, 2001 || Anderson Mesa || LONEOS || FLO || align=right | 1.4 km || 
|-id=378 bgcolor=#fefefe
| 124378 ||  || — || August 23, 2001 || Anderson Mesa || LONEOS || V || align=right | 1.2 km || 
|-id=379 bgcolor=#fefefe
| 124379 ||  || — || August 23, 2001 || Anderson Mesa || LONEOS || — || align=right | 1.4 km || 
|-id=380 bgcolor=#fefefe
| 124380 ||  || — || August 23, 2001 || Anderson Mesa || LONEOS || — || align=right | 1.3 km || 
|-id=381 bgcolor=#fefefe
| 124381 ||  || — || August 20, 2001 || Palomar || NEAT || — || align=right | 1.9 km || 
|-id=382 bgcolor=#fefefe
| 124382 ||  || — || August 24, 2001 || Haleakala || NEAT || V || align=right | 1.2 km || 
|-id=383 bgcolor=#fefefe
| 124383 ||  || — || August 24, 2001 || Haleakala || NEAT || MAS || align=right | 1.1 km || 
|-id=384 bgcolor=#fefefe
| 124384 ||  || — || August 25, 2001 || Haleakala || NEAT || — || align=right | 1.0 km || 
|-id=385 bgcolor=#E9E9E9
| 124385 ||  || — || August 26, 2001 || Socorro || LINEAR || — || align=right | 2.4 km || 
|-id=386 bgcolor=#fefefe
| 124386 ||  || — || August 21, 2001 || Kitt Peak || Spacewatch || — || align=right | 1.6 km || 
|-id=387 bgcolor=#fefefe
| 124387 ||  || — || August 27, 2001 || Palomar || NEAT || — || align=right | 2.0 km || 
|-id=388 bgcolor=#fefefe
| 124388 ||  || — || August 26, 2001 || Haleakala || NEAT || — || align=right | 2.2 km || 
|-id=389 bgcolor=#fefefe
| 124389 ||  || — || August 28, 2001 || Palomar || NEAT || — || align=right | 1.8 km || 
|-id=390 bgcolor=#fefefe
| 124390 ||  || — || August 25, 2001 || Palomar || NEAT || NYS || align=right | 1.5 km || 
|-id=391 bgcolor=#fefefe
| 124391 ||  || — || August 25, 2001 || Palomar || NEAT || — || align=right | 1.9 km || 
|-id=392 bgcolor=#fefefe
| 124392 ||  || — || August 29, 2001 || Palomar || NEAT || V || align=right | 1.6 km || 
|-id=393 bgcolor=#fefefe
| 124393 ||  || — || August 21, 2001 || Kitt Peak || Spacewatch || NYS || align=right | 2.8 km || 
|-id=394 bgcolor=#fefefe
| 124394 ||  || — || August 21, 2001 || Haleakala || NEAT || MAS || align=right | 1.6 km || 
|-id=395 bgcolor=#fefefe
| 124395 ||  || — || August 22, 2001 || Kitt Peak || Spacewatch || V || align=right | 1.2 km || 
|-id=396 bgcolor=#fefefe
| 124396 ||  || — || August 22, 2001 || Socorro || LINEAR || PHO || align=right | 4.4 km || 
|-id=397 bgcolor=#fefefe
| 124397 ||  || — || August 22, 2001 || Socorro || LINEAR || — || align=right | 1.2 km || 
|-id=398 bgcolor=#d6d6d6
| 124398 Iraklisimonia ||  ||  || August 22, 2001 || Goodricke-Pigott || R. A. Tucker || — || align=right | 6.2 km || 
|-id=399 bgcolor=#fefefe
| 124399 ||  || — || August 22, 2001 || Palomar || NEAT || KLI || align=right | 3.6 km || 
|-id=400 bgcolor=#fefefe
| 124400 ||  || — || August 22, 2001 || Socorro || LINEAR || V || align=right | 2.2 km || 
|}

124401–124500 

|-bgcolor=#fefefe
| 124401 ||  || — || August 22, 2001 || Socorro || LINEAR || — || align=right | 2.4 km || 
|-id=402 bgcolor=#fefefe
| 124402 ||  || — || August 22, 2001 || Socorro || LINEAR || — || align=right | 1.7 km || 
|-id=403 bgcolor=#fefefe
| 124403 ||  || — || August 23, 2001 || Anderson Mesa || LONEOS || — || align=right | 1.5 km || 
|-id=404 bgcolor=#fefefe
| 124404 ||  || — || August 23, 2001 || Anderson Mesa || LONEOS || NYS || align=right data-sort-value="0.81" | 810 m || 
|-id=405 bgcolor=#fefefe
| 124405 ||  || — || August 23, 2001 || Anderson Mesa || LONEOS || — || align=right | 1.1 km || 
|-id=406 bgcolor=#fefefe
| 124406 ||  || — || August 23, 2001 || Anderson Mesa || LONEOS || — || align=right | 1.0 km || 
|-id=407 bgcolor=#fefefe
| 124407 ||  || — || August 23, 2001 || Anderson Mesa || LONEOS || NYS || align=right | 1.5 km || 
|-id=408 bgcolor=#fefefe
| 124408 ||  || — || August 23, 2001 || Anderson Mesa || LONEOS || — || align=right | 1.3 km || 
|-id=409 bgcolor=#fefefe
| 124409 ||  || — || August 23, 2001 || Anderson Mesa || LONEOS || NYS || align=right | 1.2 km || 
|-id=410 bgcolor=#fefefe
| 124410 ||  || — || August 23, 2001 || Anderson Mesa || LONEOS || FLO || align=right | 1.4 km || 
|-id=411 bgcolor=#fefefe
| 124411 ||  || — || August 23, 2001 || Anderson Mesa || LONEOS || — || align=right | 2.9 km || 
|-id=412 bgcolor=#fefefe
| 124412 ||  || — || August 23, 2001 || Anderson Mesa || LONEOS || — || align=right | 1.8 km || 
|-id=413 bgcolor=#fefefe
| 124413 ||  || — || August 23, 2001 || Anderson Mesa || LONEOS || — || align=right | 1.6 km || 
|-id=414 bgcolor=#fefefe
| 124414 ||  || — || August 23, 2001 || Anderson Mesa || LONEOS || — || align=right | 2.3 km || 
|-id=415 bgcolor=#fefefe
| 124415 ||  || — || August 23, 2001 || Anderson Mesa || LONEOS || PHO || align=right | 1.9 km || 
|-id=416 bgcolor=#fefefe
| 124416 ||  || — || August 24, 2001 || Anderson Mesa || LONEOS || — || align=right | 1.8 km || 
|-id=417 bgcolor=#fefefe
| 124417 ||  || — || August 24, 2001 || Anderson Mesa || LONEOS || V || align=right | 1.1 km || 
|-id=418 bgcolor=#fefefe
| 124418 ||  || — || August 24, 2001 || Socorro || LINEAR || — || align=right | 1.3 km || 
|-id=419 bgcolor=#fefefe
| 124419 ||  || — || August 24, 2001 || Anderson Mesa || LONEOS || FLO || align=right | 1.4 km || 
|-id=420 bgcolor=#fefefe
| 124420 ||  || — || August 24, 2001 || Anderson Mesa || LONEOS || V || align=right | 1.2 km || 
|-id=421 bgcolor=#fefefe
| 124421 ||  || — || August 24, 2001 || Socorro || LINEAR || NYS || align=right | 1.0 km || 
|-id=422 bgcolor=#fefefe
| 124422 ||  || — || August 24, 2001 || Socorro || LINEAR || FLO || align=right | 1.2 km || 
|-id=423 bgcolor=#fefefe
| 124423 ||  || — || August 24, 2001 || Socorro || LINEAR || MAS || align=right | 1.1 km || 
|-id=424 bgcolor=#E9E9E9
| 124424 ||  || — || August 24, 2001 || Socorro || LINEAR || — || align=right | 1.2 km || 
|-id=425 bgcolor=#fefefe
| 124425 ||  || — || August 24, 2001 || Socorro || LINEAR || — || align=right | 1.8 km || 
|-id=426 bgcolor=#fefefe
| 124426 ||  || — || August 24, 2001 || Socorro || LINEAR || NYS || align=right data-sort-value="0.86" | 860 m || 
|-id=427 bgcolor=#fefefe
| 124427 ||  || — || August 24, 2001 || Socorro || LINEAR || — || align=right | 1.6 km || 
|-id=428 bgcolor=#fefefe
| 124428 ||  || — || August 24, 2001 || Socorro || LINEAR || — || align=right | 1.8 km || 
|-id=429 bgcolor=#fefefe
| 124429 ||  || — || August 24, 2001 || Socorro || LINEAR || FLO || align=right | 1.2 km || 
|-id=430 bgcolor=#fefefe
| 124430 ||  || — || August 24, 2001 || Socorro || LINEAR || — || align=right | 1.7 km || 
|-id=431 bgcolor=#fefefe
| 124431 ||  || — || August 24, 2001 || Socorro || LINEAR || — || align=right | 1.9 km || 
|-id=432 bgcolor=#fefefe
| 124432 ||  || — || August 24, 2001 || Socorro || LINEAR || MAS || align=right | 1.7 km || 
|-id=433 bgcolor=#fefefe
| 124433 ||  || — || August 24, 2001 || Socorro || LINEAR || — || align=right | 4.0 km || 
|-id=434 bgcolor=#fefefe
| 124434 ||  || — || August 24, 2001 || Socorro || LINEAR || FLO || align=right | 1.1 km || 
|-id=435 bgcolor=#fefefe
| 124435 ||  || — || August 24, 2001 || Socorro || LINEAR || NYS || align=right | 1.3 km || 
|-id=436 bgcolor=#fefefe
| 124436 ||  || — || August 24, 2001 || Socorro || LINEAR || — || align=right | 2.0 km || 
|-id=437 bgcolor=#fefefe
| 124437 ||  || — || August 24, 2001 || Socorro || LINEAR || — || align=right | 2.1 km || 
|-id=438 bgcolor=#fefefe
| 124438 ||  || — || August 24, 2001 || Socorro || LINEAR || V || align=right | 1.6 km || 
|-id=439 bgcolor=#fefefe
| 124439 ||  || — || August 24, 2001 || Socorro || LINEAR || FLO || align=right data-sort-value="0.94" | 940 m || 
|-id=440 bgcolor=#fefefe
| 124440 ||  || — || August 25, 2001 || Socorro || LINEAR || V || align=right | 1.3 km || 
|-id=441 bgcolor=#fefefe
| 124441 ||  || — || August 25, 2001 || Socorro || LINEAR || NYS || align=right | 1.4 km || 
|-id=442 bgcolor=#fefefe
| 124442 ||  || — || August 25, 2001 || Socorro || LINEAR || FLO || align=right | 3.7 km || 
|-id=443 bgcolor=#fefefe
| 124443 ||  || — || August 25, 2001 || Socorro || LINEAR || FLO || align=right | 1.3 km || 
|-id=444 bgcolor=#fefefe
| 124444 ||  || — || August 25, 2001 || Socorro || LINEAR || — || align=right | 1.8 km || 
|-id=445 bgcolor=#fefefe
| 124445 ||  || — || August 25, 2001 || Socorro || LINEAR || — || align=right | 1.5 km || 
|-id=446 bgcolor=#fefefe
| 124446 ||  || — || August 25, 2001 || Socorro || LINEAR || V || align=right | 1.3 km || 
|-id=447 bgcolor=#fefefe
| 124447 ||  || — || August 25, 2001 || Socorro || LINEAR || NYS || align=right | 3.4 km || 
|-id=448 bgcolor=#fefefe
| 124448 ||  || — || August 25, 2001 || Socorro || LINEAR || NYS || align=right | 1.2 km || 
|-id=449 bgcolor=#fefefe
| 124449 ||  || — || August 25, 2001 || Anderson Mesa || LONEOS || — || align=right | 2.2 km || 
|-id=450 bgcolor=#fefefe
| 124450 Shyamalan ||  ||  || August 25, 2001 || Goodricke-Pigott || R. A. Tucker || — || align=right | 3.3 km || 
|-id=451 bgcolor=#fefefe
| 124451 ||  || — || August 19, 2001 || Socorro || LINEAR || FLO || align=right | 1.1 km || 
|-id=452 bgcolor=#fefefe
| 124452 ||  || — || August 19, 2001 || Socorro || LINEAR || NYS || align=right | 2.5 km || 
|-id=453 bgcolor=#fefefe
| 124453 ||  || — || August 19, 2001 || Socorro || LINEAR || — || align=right | 1.4 km || 
|-id=454 bgcolor=#fefefe
| 124454 ||  || — || August 19, 2001 || Socorro || LINEAR || — || align=right | 1.4 km || 
|-id=455 bgcolor=#fefefe
| 124455 ||  || — || August 19, 2001 || Socorro || LINEAR || — || align=right | 1.3 km || 
|-id=456 bgcolor=#fefefe
| 124456 ||  || — || August 19, 2001 || Socorro || LINEAR || FLO || align=right | 1.2 km || 
|-id=457 bgcolor=#fefefe
| 124457 ||  || — || August 19, 2001 || Socorro || LINEAR || FLO || align=right | 1.2 km || 
|-id=458 bgcolor=#fefefe
| 124458 ||  || — || August 19, 2001 || Haleakala || NEAT || V || align=right | 1.2 km || 
|-id=459 bgcolor=#fefefe
| 124459 ||  || — || August 18, 2001 || Palomar || NEAT || MAS || align=right | 1.4 km || 
|-id=460 bgcolor=#fefefe
| 124460 ||  || — || August 16, 2001 || Socorro || LINEAR || FLO || align=right | 2.8 km || 
|-id=461 bgcolor=#fefefe
| 124461 ||  || — || August 24, 2001 || Socorro || LINEAR || NYS || align=right | 1.3 km || 
|-id=462 bgcolor=#fefefe
| 124462 ||  || — || August 24, 2001 || Socorro || LINEAR || V || align=right | 1.6 km || 
|-id=463 bgcolor=#E9E9E9
| 124463 ||  || — || August 24, 2001 || Socorro || LINEAR || — || align=right | 3.7 km || 
|-id=464 bgcolor=#fefefe
| 124464 ||  || — || August 24, 2001 || Socorro || LINEAR || FLO || align=right | 1.1 km || 
|-id=465 bgcolor=#fefefe
| 124465 ||  || — || August 24, 2001 || Socorro || LINEAR || V || align=right | 1.4 km || 
|-id=466 bgcolor=#fefefe
| 124466 ||  || — || August 23, 2001 || Haleakala || NEAT || — || align=right | 1.6 km || 
|-id=467 bgcolor=#fefefe
| 124467 ||  || — || August 19, 2001 || Socorro || LINEAR || FLO || align=right | 1.2 km || 
|-id=468 bgcolor=#fefefe
| 124468 ||  || — || August 16, 2001 || Socorro || LINEAR || V || align=right | 1.1 km || 
|-id=469 bgcolor=#fefefe
| 124469 ||  || — || August 25, 2001 || Anderson Mesa || LONEOS || FLO || align=right | 1.3 km || 
|-id=470 bgcolor=#fefefe
| 124470 ||  || — || September 8, 2001 || Socorro || LINEAR || — || align=right | 1.4 km || 
|-id=471 bgcolor=#fefefe
| 124471 ||  || — || September 8, 2001 || Socorro || LINEAR || FLO || align=right | 1.4 km || 
|-id=472 bgcolor=#fefefe
| 124472 ||  || — || September 8, 2001 || Socorro || LINEAR || NYS || align=right | 1.0 km || 
|-id=473 bgcolor=#fefefe
| 124473 ||  || — || September 8, 2001 || Socorro || LINEAR || — || align=right | 2.3 km || 
|-id=474 bgcolor=#fefefe
| 124474 ||  || — || September 10, 2001 || Desert Eagle || W. K. Y. Yeung || — || align=right | 1.8 km || 
|-id=475 bgcolor=#fefefe
| 124475 ||  || — || September 10, 2001 || Desert Eagle || W. K. Y. Yeung || NYS || align=right | 3.4 km || 
|-id=476 bgcolor=#E9E9E9
| 124476 ||  || — || September 10, 2001 || Desert Eagle || W. K. Y. Yeung || — || align=right | 1.5 km || 
|-id=477 bgcolor=#fefefe
| 124477 ||  || — || September 10, 2001 || Desert Eagle || W. K. Y. Yeung || FLO || align=right | 1.4 km || 
|-id=478 bgcolor=#fefefe
| 124478 ||  || — || September 7, 2001 || Socorro || LINEAR || MAS || align=right | 1.3 km || 
|-id=479 bgcolor=#fefefe
| 124479 ||  || — || September 9, 2001 || Socorro || LINEAR || NYS || align=right | 1.2 km || 
|-id=480 bgcolor=#fefefe
| 124480 ||  || — || September 10, 2001 || Socorro || LINEAR || — || align=right | 1.4 km || 
|-id=481 bgcolor=#fefefe
| 124481 ||  || — || September 7, 2001 || Socorro || LINEAR || — || align=right | 3.9 km || 
|-id=482 bgcolor=#fefefe
| 124482 ||  || — || September 7, 2001 || Socorro || LINEAR || FLO || align=right | 1.3 km || 
|-id=483 bgcolor=#fefefe
| 124483 ||  || — || September 7, 2001 || Socorro || LINEAR || FLO || align=right data-sort-value="0.98" | 980 m || 
|-id=484 bgcolor=#fefefe
| 124484 ||  || — || September 7, 2001 || Socorro || LINEAR || — || align=right | 1.1 km || 
|-id=485 bgcolor=#fefefe
| 124485 ||  || — || September 7, 2001 || Socorro || LINEAR || MAS || align=right data-sort-value="0.96" | 960 m || 
|-id=486 bgcolor=#fefefe
| 124486 ||  || — || September 7, 2001 || Socorro || LINEAR || — || align=right | 1.6 km || 
|-id=487 bgcolor=#fefefe
| 124487 ||  || — || September 7, 2001 || Socorro || LINEAR || V || align=right | 1.3 km || 
|-id=488 bgcolor=#fefefe
| 124488 ||  || — || September 8, 2001 || Socorro || LINEAR || FLO || align=right | 1.1 km || 
|-id=489 bgcolor=#fefefe
| 124489 ||  || — || September 8, 2001 || Socorro || LINEAR || FLO || align=right | 1.3 km || 
|-id=490 bgcolor=#fefefe
| 124490 ||  || — || September 8, 2001 || Socorro || LINEAR || V || align=right | 1.2 km || 
|-id=491 bgcolor=#fefefe
| 124491 ||  || — || September 8, 2001 || Socorro || LINEAR || MAS || align=right | 1.0 km || 
|-id=492 bgcolor=#E9E9E9
| 124492 ||  || — || September 8, 2001 || Socorro || LINEAR || — || align=right | 2.0 km || 
|-id=493 bgcolor=#fefefe
| 124493 ||  || — || September 10, 2001 || Desert Eagle || W. K. Y. Yeung || V || align=right | 1.2 km || 
|-id=494 bgcolor=#fefefe
| 124494 ||  || — || September 12, 2001 || Palomar || NEAT || FLO || align=right | 2.5 km || 
|-id=495 bgcolor=#fefefe
| 124495 ||  || — || September 12, 2001 || Palomar || NEAT || NYS || align=right | 1.6 km || 
|-id=496 bgcolor=#fefefe
| 124496 ||  || — || September 13, 2001 || Palomar || NEAT || — || align=right | 3.6 km || 
|-id=497 bgcolor=#fefefe
| 124497 ||  || — || September 12, 2001 || Palomar || NEAT || — || align=right | 3.9 km || 
|-id=498 bgcolor=#fefefe
| 124498 ||  || — || September 14, 2001 || Palomar || NEAT || — || align=right | 1.2 km || 
|-id=499 bgcolor=#FA8072
| 124499 ||  || — || September 12, 2001 || Desert Eagle || W. K. Y. Yeung || — || align=right | 1.7 km || 
|-id=500 bgcolor=#fefefe
| 124500 ||  || — || September 9, 2001 || Socorro || LINEAR || FLO || align=right | 1.1 km || 
|}

124501–124600 

|-bgcolor=#E9E9E9
| 124501 ||  || — || September 10, 2001 || Socorro || LINEAR || — || align=right | 1.7 km || 
|-id=502 bgcolor=#fefefe
| 124502 ||  || — || September 10, 2001 || Socorro || LINEAR || V || align=right | 1.2 km || 
|-id=503 bgcolor=#fefefe
| 124503 ||  || — || September 11, 2001 || Socorro || LINEAR || — || align=right | 2.2 km || 
|-id=504 bgcolor=#fefefe
| 124504 ||  || — || September 12, 2001 || Socorro || LINEAR || FLO || align=right | 1.1 km || 
|-id=505 bgcolor=#fefefe
| 124505 ||  || — || September 12, 2001 || Socorro || LINEAR || NYS || align=right | 1.4 km || 
|-id=506 bgcolor=#fefefe
| 124506 ||  || — || September 12, 2001 || Socorro || LINEAR || V || align=right | 1.3 km || 
|-id=507 bgcolor=#fefefe
| 124507 ||  || — || September 10, 2001 || Socorro || LINEAR || — || align=right | 1.5 km || 
|-id=508 bgcolor=#fefefe
| 124508 ||  || — || September 10, 2001 || Socorro || LINEAR || V || align=right | 1.2 km || 
|-id=509 bgcolor=#fefefe
| 124509 ||  || — || September 10, 2001 || Socorro || LINEAR || — || align=right | 2.0 km || 
|-id=510 bgcolor=#fefefe
| 124510 ||  || — || September 10, 2001 || Socorro || LINEAR || V || align=right | 1.2 km || 
|-id=511 bgcolor=#fefefe
| 124511 ||  || — || September 10, 2001 || Socorro || LINEAR || — || align=right | 4.4 km || 
|-id=512 bgcolor=#fefefe
| 124512 ||  || — || September 10, 2001 || Socorro || LINEAR || — || align=right | 5.1 km || 
|-id=513 bgcolor=#fefefe
| 124513 ||  || — || September 10, 2001 || Socorro || LINEAR || — || align=right | 1.5 km || 
|-id=514 bgcolor=#fefefe
| 124514 ||  || — || September 10, 2001 || Socorro || LINEAR || V || align=right | 1.6 km || 
|-id=515 bgcolor=#fefefe
| 124515 ||  || — || September 10, 2001 || Socorro || LINEAR || FLO || align=right | 1.2 km || 
|-id=516 bgcolor=#fefefe
| 124516 ||  || — || September 10, 2001 || Socorro || LINEAR || — || align=right | 1.4 km || 
|-id=517 bgcolor=#fefefe
| 124517 ||  || — || September 10, 2001 || Socorro || LINEAR || FLO || align=right | 1.2 km || 
|-id=518 bgcolor=#fefefe
| 124518 ||  || — || September 10, 2001 || Socorro || LINEAR || FLO || align=right | 2.0 km || 
|-id=519 bgcolor=#fefefe
| 124519 ||  || — || September 10, 2001 || Socorro || LINEAR || — || align=right | 1.5 km || 
|-id=520 bgcolor=#fefefe
| 124520 ||  || — || September 10, 2001 || Socorro || LINEAR || — || align=right | 3.8 km || 
|-id=521 bgcolor=#fefefe
| 124521 ||  || — || September 10, 2001 || Socorro || LINEAR || — || align=right | 1.6 km || 
|-id=522 bgcolor=#fefefe
| 124522 ||  || — || September 10, 2001 || Socorro || LINEAR || FLO || align=right | 2.5 km || 
|-id=523 bgcolor=#fefefe
| 124523 ||  || — || September 10, 2001 || Socorro || LINEAR || — || align=right | 1.7 km || 
|-id=524 bgcolor=#fefefe
| 124524 ||  || — || September 9, 2001 || Palomar || NEAT || — || align=right | 2.2 km || 
|-id=525 bgcolor=#fefefe
| 124525 ||  || — || September 14, 2001 || Palomar || NEAT || NYS || align=right | 3.2 km || 
|-id=526 bgcolor=#fefefe
| 124526 ||  || — || September 11, 2001 || Anderson Mesa || LONEOS || — || align=right | 1.5 km || 
|-id=527 bgcolor=#fefefe
| 124527 ||  || — || September 11, 2001 || Anderson Mesa || LONEOS || V || align=right | 1.3 km || 
|-id=528 bgcolor=#fefefe
| 124528 ||  || — || September 11, 2001 || Anderson Mesa || LONEOS || NYS || align=right | 1.1 km || 
|-id=529 bgcolor=#fefefe
| 124529 ||  || — || September 11, 2001 || Anderson Mesa || LONEOS || NYS || align=right | 1.4 km || 
|-id=530 bgcolor=#fefefe
| 124530 ||  || — || September 11, 2001 || Anderson Mesa || LONEOS || V || align=right | 1.2 km || 
|-id=531 bgcolor=#fefefe
| 124531 ||  || — || September 11, 2001 || Anderson Mesa || LONEOS || FLO || align=right | 1.2 km || 
|-id=532 bgcolor=#fefefe
| 124532 ||  || — || September 11, 2001 || Anderson Mesa || LONEOS || — || align=right | 1.2 km || 
|-id=533 bgcolor=#fefefe
| 124533 ||  || — || September 11, 2001 || Anderson Mesa || LONEOS || NYS || align=right | 1.3 km || 
|-id=534 bgcolor=#fefefe
| 124534 ||  || — || September 11, 2001 || Anderson Mesa || LONEOS || — || align=right | 1.1 km || 
|-id=535 bgcolor=#E9E9E9
| 124535 ||  || — || September 11, 2001 || Anderson Mesa || LONEOS || — || align=right | 1.8 km || 
|-id=536 bgcolor=#fefefe
| 124536 ||  || — || September 11, 2001 || Anderson Mesa || LONEOS || NYS || align=right | 3.5 km || 
|-id=537 bgcolor=#fefefe
| 124537 ||  || — || September 11, 2001 || Anderson Mesa || LONEOS || — || align=right | 1.5 km || 
|-id=538 bgcolor=#fefefe
| 124538 ||  || — || September 11, 2001 || Kitt Peak || Spacewatch || NYS || align=right | 3.2 km || 
|-id=539 bgcolor=#E9E9E9
| 124539 ||  || — || September 11, 2001 || Kitt Peak || Spacewatch || — || align=right | 1.6 km || 
|-id=540 bgcolor=#fefefe
| 124540 ||  || — || September 12, 2001 || Kitt Peak || Spacewatch || NYS || align=right | 1.3 km || 
|-id=541 bgcolor=#fefefe
| 124541 ||  || — || September 12, 2001 || Kitt Peak || Spacewatch || — || align=right | 1.4 km || 
|-id=542 bgcolor=#fefefe
| 124542 ||  || — || September 12, 2001 || Socorro || LINEAR || ERI || align=right | 2.6 km || 
|-id=543 bgcolor=#fefefe
| 124543 ||  || — || September 12, 2001 || Socorro || LINEAR || — || align=right | 2.6 km || 
|-id=544 bgcolor=#fefefe
| 124544 ||  || — || September 12, 2001 || Socorro || LINEAR || — || align=right | 1.1 km || 
|-id=545 bgcolor=#fefefe
| 124545 ||  || — || September 12, 2001 || Socorro || LINEAR || — || align=right data-sort-value="0.90" | 900 m || 
|-id=546 bgcolor=#fefefe
| 124546 ||  || — || September 12, 2001 || Socorro || LINEAR || NYS || align=right | 1.1 km || 
|-id=547 bgcolor=#fefefe
| 124547 ||  || — || September 12, 2001 || Socorro || LINEAR || MAS || align=right | 1.1 km || 
|-id=548 bgcolor=#fefefe
| 124548 ||  || — || September 12, 2001 || Socorro || LINEAR || V || align=right | 1.3 km || 
|-id=549 bgcolor=#fefefe
| 124549 ||  || — || September 12, 2001 || Socorro || LINEAR || MAS || align=right | 1.5 km || 
|-id=550 bgcolor=#fefefe
| 124550 ||  || — || September 12, 2001 || Socorro || LINEAR || — || align=right | 2.3 km || 
|-id=551 bgcolor=#fefefe
| 124551 ||  || — || September 12, 2001 || Socorro || LINEAR || — || align=right | 2.1 km || 
|-id=552 bgcolor=#fefefe
| 124552 ||  || — || September 12, 2001 || Socorro || LINEAR || — || align=right | 1.8 km || 
|-id=553 bgcolor=#fefefe
| 124553 ||  || — || September 12, 2001 || Socorro || LINEAR || — || align=right | 1.4 km || 
|-id=554 bgcolor=#fefefe
| 124554 ||  || — || September 12, 2001 || Socorro || LINEAR || — || align=right | 3.8 km || 
|-id=555 bgcolor=#fefefe
| 124555 ||  || — || September 12, 2001 || Socorro || LINEAR || — || align=right | 2.5 km || 
|-id=556 bgcolor=#fefefe
| 124556 ||  || — || September 12, 2001 || Socorro || LINEAR || NYS || align=right | 1.5 km || 
|-id=557 bgcolor=#fefefe
| 124557 ||  || — || September 12, 2001 || Socorro || LINEAR || NYS || align=right | 1.9 km || 
|-id=558 bgcolor=#fefefe
| 124558 ||  || — || September 11, 2001 || Anderson Mesa || LONEOS || V || align=right | 1.4 km || 
|-id=559 bgcolor=#fefefe
| 124559 ||  || — || September 11, 2001 || Anderson Mesa || LONEOS || FLO || align=right | 1.3 km || 
|-id=560 bgcolor=#fefefe
| 124560 ||  || — || September 11, 2001 || Anderson Mesa || LONEOS || — || align=right | 1.8 km || 
|-id=561 bgcolor=#fefefe
| 124561 || 2001 ST || — || September 17, 2001 || Fountain Hills || C. W. Juels, P. R. Holvorcem || KLI || align=right | 3.3 km || 
|-id=562 bgcolor=#E9E9E9
| 124562 || 2001 SU || — || September 17, 2001 || Fountain Hills || C. W. Juels, P. R. Holvorcem || — || align=right | 5.1 km || 
|-id=563 bgcolor=#fefefe
| 124563 ||  || — || September 17, 2001 || Desert Eagle || W. K. Y. Yeung || — || align=right data-sort-value="0.91" | 910 m || 
|-id=564 bgcolor=#fefefe
| 124564 ||  || — || September 17, 2001 || Desert Eagle || W. K. Y. Yeung || — || align=right | 1.2 km || 
|-id=565 bgcolor=#fefefe
| 124565 ||  || — || September 17, 2001 || Desert Eagle || W. K. Y. Yeung || — || align=right | 1.3 km || 
|-id=566 bgcolor=#fefefe
| 124566 ||  || — || September 17, 2001 || Desert Eagle || W. K. Y. Yeung || MAS || align=right | 1.8 km || 
|-id=567 bgcolor=#fefefe
| 124567 ||  || — || September 17, 2001 || Desert Eagle || W. K. Y. Yeung || MAS || align=right | 1.4 km || 
|-id=568 bgcolor=#fefefe
| 124568 ||  || — || September 17, 2001 || Desert Eagle || W. K. Y. Yeung || NYS || align=right | 1.3 km || 
|-id=569 bgcolor=#fefefe
| 124569 ||  || — || September 17, 2001 || Goodricke-Pigott || R. A. Tucker || NYS || align=right | 1.4 km || 
|-id=570 bgcolor=#fefefe
| 124570 ||  || — || September 18, 2001 || Goodricke-Pigott || R. A. Tucker || FLO || align=right | 1.9 km || 
|-id=571 bgcolor=#fefefe
| 124571 ||  || — || September 18, 2001 || Goodricke-Pigott || R. A. Tucker || FLO || align=right | 1.1 km || 
|-id=572 bgcolor=#fefefe
| 124572 ||  || — || September 17, 2001 || Socorro || LINEAR || PHO || align=right | 1.9 km || 
|-id=573 bgcolor=#fefefe
| 124573 ||  || — || September 18, 2001 || Desert Eagle || W. K. Y. Yeung || V || align=right | 1.3 km || 
|-id=574 bgcolor=#fefefe
| 124574 ||  || — || September 18, 2001 || Desert Eagle || W. K. Y. Yeung || NYS || align=right | 1.4 km || 
|-id=575 bgcolor=#fefefe
| 124575 ||  || — || September 16, 2001 || Socorro || LINEAR || — || align=right | 3.9 km || 
|-id=576 bgcolor=#fefefe
| 124576 ||  || — || September 16, 2001 || Socorro || LINEAR || — || align=right | 1.2 km || 
|-id=577 bgcolor=#fefefe
| 124577 ||  || — || September 16, 2001 || Socorro || LINEAR || — || align=right | 1.0 km || 
|-id=578 bgcolor=#fefefe
| 124578 ||  || — || September 16, 2001 || Socorro || LINEAR || FLO || align=right | 2.2 km || 
|-id=579 bgcolor=#fefefe
| 124579 ||  || — || September 16, 2001 || Socorro || LINEAR || EUT || align=right | 1.3 km || 
|-id=580 bgcolor=#fefefe
| 124580 ||  || — || September 16, 2001 || Socorro || LINEAR || — || align=right | 1.5 km || 
|-id=581 bgcolor=#fefefe
| 124581 ||  || — || September 16, 2001 || Socorro || LINEAR || — || align=right | 1.7 km || 
|-id=582 bgcolor=#fefefe
| 124582 ||  || — || September 16, 2001 || Socorro || LINEAR || NYS || align=right | 1.1 km || 
|-id=583 bgcolor=#fefefe
| 124583 ||  || — || September 16, 2001 || Socorro || LINEAR || — || align=right | 1.1 km || 
|-id=584 bgcolor=#fefefe
| 124584 ||  || — || September 16, 2001 || Socorro || LINEAR || — || align=right | 1.6 km || 
|-id=585 bgcolor=#fefefe
| 124585 ||  || — || September 16, 2001 || Socorro || LINEAR || MAS || align=right | 1.0 km || 
|-id=586 bgcolor=#fefefe
| 124586 ||  || — || September 16, 2001 || Socorro || LINEAR || — || align=right | 1.3 km || 
|-id=587 bgcolor=#E9E9E9
| 124587 ||  || — || September 16, 2001 || Socorro || LINEAR || — || align=right | 1.8 km || 
|-id=588 bgcolor=#E9E9E9
| 124588 ||  || — || September 16, 2001 || Socorro || LINEAR || — || align=right | 1.8 km || 
|-id=589 bgcolor=#fefefe
| 124589 ||  || — || September 16, 2001 || Socorro || LINEAR || NYS || align=right | 1.5 km || 
|-id=590 bgcolor=#fefefe
| 124590 ||  || — || September 16, 2001 || Socorro || LINEAR || — || align=right | 1.3 km || 
|-id=591 bgcolor=#fefefe
| 124591 ||  || — || September 16, 2001 || Socorro || LINEAR || ERI || align=right | 2.7 km || 
|-id=592 bgcolor=#fefefe
| 124592 ||  || — || September 16, 2001 || Socorro || LINEAR || — || align=right | 3.8 km || 
|-id=593 bgcolor=#fefefe
| 124593 ||  || — || September 16, 2001 || Socorro || LINEAR || FLO || align=right | 1.5 km || 
|-id=594 bgcolor=#fefefe
| 124594 ||  || — || September 16, 2001 || Socorro || LINEAR || V || align=right | 1.6 km || 
|-id=595 bgcolor=#fefefe
| 124595 ||  || — || September 16, 2001 || Socorro || LINEAR || FLO || align=right | 1.2 km || 
|-id=596 bgcolor=#fefefe
| 124596 ||  || — || September 16, 2001 || Socorro || LINEAR || — || align=right | 3.6 km || 
|-id=597 bgcolor=#E9E9E9
| 124597 ||  || — || September 16, 2001 || Socorro || LINEAR || — || align=right | 2.2 km || 
|-id=598 bgcolor=#fefefe
| 124598 ||  || — || September 16, 2001 || Socorro || LINEAR || — || align=right | 1.0 km || 
|-id=599 bgcolor=#fefefe
| 124599 ||  || — || September 16, 2001 || Socorro || LINEAR || V || align=right | 1.1 km || 
|-id=600 bgcolor=#fefefe
| 124600 ||  || — || September 16, 2001 || Socorro || LINEAR || NYS || align=right | 1.3 km || 
|}

124601–124700 

|-bgcolor=#fefefe
| 124601 ||  || — || September 16, 2001 || Socorro || LINEAR || NYS || align=right | 1.9 km || 
|-id=602 bgcolor=#fefefe
| 124602 ||  || — || September 16, 2001 || Socorro || LINEAR || — || align=right | 1.6 km || 
|-id=603 bgcolor=#fefefe
| 124603 ||  || — || September 16, 2001 || Socorro || LINEAR || — || align=right | 3.4 km || 
|-id=604 bgcolor=#fefefe
| 124604 ||  || — || September 16, 2001 || Socorro || LINEAR || NYS || align=right | 3.6 km || 
|-id=605 bgcolor=#fefefe
| 124605 ||  || — || September 16, 2001 || Socorro || LINEAR || — || align=right | 3.2 km || 
|-id=606 bgcolor=#fefefe
| 124606 ||  || — || September 16, 2001 || Socorro || LINEAR || NYS || align=right | 1.1 km || 
|-id=607 bgcolor=#fefefe
| 124607 ||  || — || September 16, 2001 || Socorro || LINEAR || — || align=right | 1.5 km || 
|-id=608 bgcolor=#fefefe
| 124608 ||  || — || September 16, 2001 || Socorro || LINEAR || — || align=right | 3.9 km || 
|-id=609 bgcolor=#fefefe
| 124609 ||  || — || September 16, 2001 || Socorro || LINEAR || FLO || align=right | 1.6 km || 
|-id=610 bgcolor=#fefefe
| 124610 ||  || — || September 16, 2001 || Socorro || LINEAR || MAS || align=right | 1.3 km || 
|-id=611 bgcolor=#fefefe
| 124611 ||  || — || September 16, 2001 || Socorro || LINEAR || NYS || align=right | 1.3 km || 
|-id=612 bgcolor=#fefefe
| 124612 ||  || — || September 16, 2001 || Socorro || LINEAR || NYS || align=right | 1.3 km || 
|-id=613 bgcolor=#fefefe
| 124613 ||  || — || September 16, 2001 || Socorro || LINEAR || NYS || align=right data-sort-value="0.91" | 910 m || 
|-id=614 bgcolor=#fefefe
| 124614 ||  || — || September 16, 2001 || Socorro || LINEAR || — || align=right | 1.3 km || 
|-id=615 bgcolor=#fefefe
| 124615 ||  || — || September 16, 2001 || Socorro || LINEAR || V || align=right | 1.3 km || 
|-id=616 bgcolor=#fefefe
| 124616 ||  || — || September 16, 2001 || Socorro || LINEAR || — || align=right | 1.3 km || 
|-id=617 bgcolor=#fefefe
| 124617 ||  || — || September 16, 2001 || Socorro || LINEAR || — || align=right | 1.4 km || 
|-id=618 bgcolor=#fefefe
| 124618 ||  || — || September 16, 2001 || Socorro || LINEAR || — || align=right | 1.4 km || 
|-id=619 bgcolor=#fefefe
| 124619 ||  || — || September 16, 2001 || Socorro || LINEAR || fast? || align=right | 2.1 km || 
|-id=620 bgcolor=#fefefe
| 124620 ||  || — || September 16, 2001 || Socorro || LINEAR || slow || align=right | 1.9 km || 
|-id=621 bgcolor=#fefefe
| 124621 ||  || — || September 16, 2001 || Socorro || LINEAR || — || align=right | 1.3 km || 
|-id=622 bgcolor=#fefefe
| 124622 ||  || — || September 16, 2001 || Socorro || LINEAR || FLO || align=right | 1.0 km || 
|-id=623 bgcolor=#fefefe
| 124623 ||  || — || September 16, 2001 || Socorro || LINEAR || FLO || align=right | 1.2 km || 
|-id=624 bgcolor=#fefefe
| 124624 ||  || — || September 16, 2001 || Socorro || LINEAR || FLO || align=right | 3.0 km || 
|-id=625 bgcolor=#fefefe
| 124625 ||  || — || September 17, 2001 || Socorro || LINEAR || FLO || align=right | 2.7 km || 
|-id=626 bgcolor=#fefefe
| 124626 ||  || — || September 17, 2001 || Socorro || LINEAR || — || align=right data-sort-value="0.95" | 950 m || 
|-id=627 bgcolor=#fefefe
| 124627 ||  || — || September 17, 2001 || Socorro || LINEAR || — || align=right | 1.7 km || 
|-id=628 bgcolor=#fefefe
| 124628 ||  || — || September 17, 2001 || Socorro || LINEAR || V || align=right | 1.5 km || 
|-id=629 bgcolor=#fefefe
| 124629 ||  || — || September 17, 2001 || Socorro || LINEAR || — || align=right | 1.2 km || 
|-id=630 bgcolor=#E9E9E9
| 124630 ||  || — || September 17, 2001 || Socorro || LINEAR || — || align=right | 2.4 km || 
|-id=631 bgcolor=#fefefe
| 124631 ||  || — || September 17, 2001 || Socorro || LINEAR || — || align=right | 1.2 km || 
|-id=632 bgcolor=#fefefe
| 124632 ||  || — || September 17, 2001 || Socorro || LINEAR || V || align=right | 1.3 km || 
|-id=633 bgcolor=#fefefe
| 124633 ||  || — || September 17, 2001 || Socorro || LINEAR || — || align=right | 1.5 km || 
|-id=634 bgcolor=#fefefe
| 124634 ||  || — || September 17, 2001 || Socorro || LINEAR || — || align=right | 3.2 km || 
|-id=635 bgcolor=#fefefe
| 124635 ||  || — || September 17, 2001 || Socorro || LINEAR || — || align=right | 1.9 km || 
|-id=636 bgcolor=#fefefe
| 124636 ||  || — || September 17, 2001 || Socorro || LINEAR || ERI || align=right | 3.6 km || 
|-id=637 bgcolor=#fefefe
| 124637 ||  || — || September 17, 2001 || Socorro || LINEAR || — || align=right | 1.9 km || 
|-id=638 bgcolor=#fefefe
| 124638 ||  || — || September 17, 2001 || Socorro || LINEAR || FLO || align=right | 1.3 km || 
|-id=639 bgcolor=#fefefe
| 124639 ||  || — || September 17, 2001 || Socorro || LINEAR || V || align=right | 1.1 km || 
|-id=640 bgcolor=#fefefe
| 124640 ||  || — || September 17, 2001 || Socorro || LINEAR || — || align=right | 3.1 km || 
|-id=641 bgcolor=#fefefe
| 124641 ||  || — || September 17, 2001 || Socorro || LINEAR || — || align=right | 1.5 km || 
|-id=642 bgcolor=#fefefe
| 124642 ||  || — || September 17, 2001 || Socorro || LINEAR || — || align=right | 1.9 km || 
|-id=643 bgcolor=#E9E9E9
| 124643 ||  || — || September 17, 2001 || Socorro || LINEAR || — || align=right | 4.4 km || 
|-id=644 bgcolor=#fefefe
| 124644 ||  || — || September 17, 2001 || Socorro || LINEAR || — || align=right | 2.0 km || 
|-id=645 bgcolor=#fefefe
| 124645 ||  || — || September 17, 2001 || Socorro || LINEAR || — || align=right | 1.9 km || 
|-id=646 bgcolor=#fefefe
| 124646 ||  || — || September 17, 2001 || Socorro || LINEAR || V || align=right | 1.3 km || 
|-id=647 bgcolor=#fefefe
| 124647 ||  || — || September 17, 2001 || Socorro || LINEAR || FLO || align=right | 1.0 km || 
|-id=648 bgcolor=#fefefe
| 124648 ||  || — || September 17, 2001 || Socorro || LINEAR || FLO || align=right | 1.6 km || 
|-id=649 bgcolor=#fefefe
| 124649 ||  || — || September 17, 2001 || Socorro || LINEAR || — || align=right | 1.9 km || 
|-id=650 bgcolor=#E9E9E9
| 124650 ||  || — || September 17, 2001 || Socorro || LINEAR || — || align=right | 4.5 km || 
|-id=651 bgcolor=#fefefe
| 124651 ||  || — || September 17, 2001 || Socorro || LINEAR || V || align=right | 1.4 km || 
|-id=652 bgcolor=#fefefe
| 124652 ||  || — || September 17, 2001 || Socorro || LINEAR || V || align=right | 2.3 km || 
|-id=653 bgcolor=#E9E9E9
| 124653 ||  || — || September 17, 2001 || Socorro || LINEAR || — || align=right | 2.3 km || 
|-id=654 bgcolor=#fefefe
| 124654 ||  || — || September 16, 2001 || Palomar || NEAT || — || align=right | 1.6 km || 
|-id=655 bgcolor=#fefefe
| 124655 ||  || — || September 19, 2001 || Anderson Mesa || LONEOS || V || align=right | 1.5 km || 
|-id=656 bgcolor=#fefefe
| 124656 ||  || — || September 19, 2001 || Anderson Mesa || LONEOS || — || align=right | 1.4 km || 
|-id=657 bgcolor=#fefefe
| 124657 ||  || — || September 16, 2001 || Socorro || LINEAR || FLO || align=right | 1.3 km || 
|-id=658 bgcolor=#fefefe
| 124658 ||  || — || September 16, 2001 || Socorro || LINEAR || — || align=right | 1.9 km || 
|-id=659 bgcolor=#E9E9E9
| 124659 ||  || — || September 20, 2001 || Socorro || LINEAR || — || align=right | 1.5 km || 
|-id=660 bgcolor=#fefefe
| 124660 ||  || — || September 20, 2001 || Socorro || LINEAR || NYS || align=right data-sort-value="0.95" | 950 m || 
|-id=661 bgcolor=#fefefe
| 124661 ||  || — || September 20, 2001 || Socorro || LINEAR || — || align=right | 1.3 km || 
|-id=662 bgcolor=#fefefe
| 124662 ||  || — || September 20, 2001 || Socorro || LINEAR || V || align=right data-sort-value="0.93" | 930 m || 
|-id=663 bgcolor=#fefefe
| 124663 ||  || — || September 20, 2001 || Socorro || LINEAR || FLO || align=right | 3.2 km || 
|-id=664 bgcolor=#fefefe
| 124664 ||  || — || September 20, 2001 || Socorro || LINEAR || NYS || align=right | 1.0 km || 
|-id=665 bgcolor=#fefefe
| 124665 ||  || — || September 20, 2001 || Socorro || LINEAR || — || align=right data-sort-value="0.92" | 920 m || 
|-id=666 bgcolor=#E9E9E9
| 124666 ||  || — || September 20, 2001 || Socorro || LINEAR || — || align=right | 2.5 km || 
|-id=667 bgcolor=#fefefe
| 124667 ||  || — || September 20, 2001 || Socorro || LINEAR || NYS || align=right | 1.4 km || 
|-id=668 bgcolor=#E9E9E9
| 124668 ||  || — || September 20, 2001 || Socorro || LINEAR || — || align=right | 1.3 km || 
|-id=669 bgcolor=#E9E9E9
| 124669 ||  || — || September 20, 2001 || Socorro || LINEAR || PAD || align=right | 3.2 km || 
|-id=670 bgcolor=#fefefe
| 124670 ||  || — || September 20, 2001 || Socorro || LINEAR || — || align=right | 1.7 km || 
|-id=671 bgcolor=#fefefe
| 124671 ||  || — || September 20, 2001 || Socorro || LINEAR || V || align=right | 1.6 km || 
|-id=672 bgcolor=#E9E9E9
| 124672 ||  || — || September 20, 2001 || Socorro || LINEAR || RAF || align=right | 2.2 km || 
|-id=673 bgcolor=#fefefe
| 124673 ||  || — || September 20, 2001 || Socorro || LINEAR || — || align=right | 1.3 km || 
|-id=674 bgcolor=#fefefe
| 124674 ||  || — || September 20, 2001 || Socorro || LINEAR || V || align=right | 1.9 km || 
|-id=675 bgcolor=#fefefe
| 124675 ||  || — || September 20, 2001 || Socorro || LINEAR || V || align=right | 1.5 km || 
|-id=676 bgcolor=#fefefe
| 124676 ||  || — || September 20, 2001 || Socorro || LINEAR || — || align=right | 2.2 km || 
|-id=677 bgcolor=#fefefe
| 124677 ||  || — || September 20, 2001 || Socorro || LINEAR || — || align=right | 2.5 km || 
|-id=678 bgcolor=#fefefe
| 124678 ||  || — || September 20, 2001 || Socorro || LINEAR || — || align=right | 2.6 km || 
|-id=679 bgcolor=#E9E9E9
| 124679 ||  || — || September 20, 2001 || Socorro || LINEAR || — || align=right | 2.1 km || 
|-id=680 bgcolor=#fefefe
| 124680 ||  || — || September 20, 2001 || Socorro || LINEAR || — || align=right | 1.9 km || 
|-id=681 bgcolor=#fefefe
| 124681 ||  || — || September 18, 2001 || Desert Eagle || W. K. Y. Yeung || V || align=right | 2.0 km || 
|-id=682 bgcolor=#fefefe
| 124682 ||  || — || September 18, 2001 || Desert Eagle || W. K. Y. Yeung || — || align=right | 2.0 km || 
|-id=683 bgcolor=#fefefe
| 124683 ||  || — || September 20, 2001 || Desert Eagle || W. K. Y. Yeung || V || align=right | 1.0 km || 
|-id=684 bgcolor=#fefefe
| 124684 ||  || — || September 20, 2001 || Desert Eagle || W. K. Y. Yeung || — || align=right | 2.1 km || 
|-id=685 bgcolor=#fefefe
| 124685 ||  || — || September 18, 2001 || Desert Eagle || W. K. Y. Yeung || — || align=right | 2.0 km || 
|-id=686 bgcolor=#fefefe
| 124686 ||  || — || September 16, 2001 || Socorro || LINEAR || — || align=right | 1.2 km || 
|-id=687 bgcolor=#fefefe
| 124687 ||  || — || September 16, 2001 || Socorro || LINEAR || — || align=right | 1.3 km || 
|-id=688 bgcolor=#fefefe
| 124688 ||  || — || September 16, 2001 || Socorro || LINEAR || V || align=right | 1.6 km || 
|-id=689 bgcolor=#fefefe
| 124689 ||  || — || September 16, 2001 || Socorro || LINEAR || — || align=right | 1.2 km || 
|-id=690 bgcolor=#fefefe
| 124690 ||  || — || September 16, 2001 || Socorro || LINEAR || — || align=right | 1.4 km || 
|-id=691 bgcolor=#fefefe
| 124691 ||  || — || September 16, 2001 || Socorro || LINEAR || — || align=right | 1.4 km || 
|-id=692 bgcolor=#fefefe
| 124692 ||  || — || September 16, 2001 || Socorro || LINEAR || NYS || align=right | 1.3 km || 
|-id=693 bgcolor=#fefefe
| 124693 ||  || — || September 16, 2001 || Socorro || LINEAR || — || align=right data-sort-value="0.76" | 760 m || 
|-id=694 bgcolor=#fefefe
| 124694 ||  || — || September 16, 2001 || Socorro || LINEAR || V || align=right | 1.2 km || 
|-id=695 bgcolor=#C2FFFF
| 124695 ||  || — || September 16, 2001 || Socorro || LINEAR || L5 || align=right | 17 km || 
|-id=696 bgcolor=#C2FFFF
| 124696 ||  || — || September 16, 2001 || Socorro || LINEAR || L5 || align=right | 15 km || 
|-id=697 bgcolor=#E9E9E9
| 124697 ||  || — || September 16, 2001 || Socorro || LINEAR || — || align=right | 1.4 km || 
|-id=698 bgcolor=#fefefe
| 124698 ||  || — || September 16, 2001 || Socorro || LINEAR || NYS || align=right data-sort-value="0.91" | 910 m || 
|-id=699 bgcolor=#E9E9E9
| 124699 ||  || — || September 16, 2001 || Socorro || LINEAR || — || align=right | 1.3 km || 
|-id=700 bgcolor=#fefefe
| 124700 ||  || — || September 16, 2001 || Socorro || LINEAR || FLO || align=right | 1.5 km || 
|}

124701–124800 

|-bgcolor=#fefefe
| 124701 ||  || — || September 16, 2001 || Socorro || LINEAR || — || align=right | 2.0 km || 
|-id=702 bgcolor=#fefefe
| 124702 ||  || — || September 16, 2001 || Socorro || LINEAR || FLO || align=right | 1.3 km || 
|-id=703 bgcolor=#fefefe
| 124703 ||  || — || September 17, 2001 || Socorro || LINEAR || — || align=right | 1.5 km || 
|-id=704 bgcolor=#fefefe
| 124704 ||  || — || September 17, 2001 || Socorro || LINEAR || — || align=right | 1.3 km || 
|-id=705 bgcolor=#fefefe
| 124705 ||  || — || September 17, 2001 || Socorro || LINEAR || V || align=right | 1.8 km || 
|-id=706 bgcolor=#fefefe
| 124706 ||  || — || September 17, 2001 || Socorro || LINEAR || — || align=right | 1.8 km || 
|-id=707 bgcolor=#fefefe
| 124707 ||  || — || September 17, 2001 || Socorro || LINEAR || FLO || align=right | 1.9 km || 
|-id=708 bgcolor=#fefefe
| 124708 ||  || — || September 17, 2001 || Socorro || LINEAR || — || align=right | 1.3 km || 
|-id=709 bgcolor=#E9E9E9
| 124709 ||  || — || September 17, 2001 || Socorro || LINEAR || ADE || align=right | 2.6 km || 
|-id=710 bgcolor=#fefefe
| 124710 ||  || — || September 17, 2001 || Socorro || LINEAR || — || align=right | 3.4 km || 
|-id=711 bgcolor=#fefefe
| 124711 ||  || — || September 17, 2001 || Socorro || LINEAR || NYS || align=right | 1.3 km || 
|-id=712 bgcolor=#fefefe
| 124712 ||  || — || September 17, 2001 || Socorro || LINEAR || — || align=right | 1.5 km || 
|-id=713 bgcolor=#fefefe
| 124713 ||  || — || September 17, 2001 || Socorro || LINEAR || NYS || align=right | 1.1 km || 
|-id=714 bgcolor=#E9E9E9
| 124714 ||  || — || September 17, 2001 || Socorro || LINEAR || — || align=right | 1.7 km || 
|-id=715 bgcolor=#fefefe
| 124715 ||  || — || September 17, 2001 || Socorro || LINEAR || NYS || align=right | 1.1 km || 
|-id=716 bgcolor=#fefefe
| 124716 ||  || — || September 17, 2001 || Socorro || LINEAR || V || align=right | 1.3 km || 
|-id=717 bgcolor=#fefefe
| 124717 ||  || — || September 17, 2001 || Socorro || LINEAR || — || align=right | 1.2 km || 
|-id=718 bgcolor=#fefefe
| 124718 ||  || — || September 17, 2001 || Socorro || LINEAR || — || align=right | 1.9 km || 
|-id=719 bgcolor=#fefefe
| 124719 ||  || — || September 17, 2001 || Socorro || LINEAR || V || align=right | 1.1 km || 
|-id=720 bgcolor=#fefefe
| 124720 ||  || — || September 17, 2001 || Socorro || LINEAR || NYS || align=right | 1.1 km || 
|-id=721 bgcolor=#fefefe
| 124721 ||  || — || September 17, 2001 || Socorro || LINEAR || — || align=right | 1.7 km || 
|-id=722 bgcolor=#fefefe
| 124722 ||  || — || September 17, 2001 || Socorro || LINEAR || — || align=right | 1.2 km || 
|-id=723 bgcolor=#fefefe
| 124723 ||  || — || September 17, 2001 || Socorro || LINEAR || FLO || align=right | 1.3 km || 
|-id=724 bgcolor=#fefefe
| 124724 ||  || — || September 17, 2001 || Socorro || LINEAR || — || align=right | 1.5 km || 
|-id=725 bgcolor=#fefefe
| 124725 ||  || — || September 19, 2001 || Socorro || LINEAR || — || align=right | 1.9 km || 
|-id=726 bgcolor=#fefefe
| 124726 ||  || — || September 19, 2001 || Socorro || LINEAR || V || align=right | 1.2 km || 
|-id=727 bgcolor=#fefefe
| 124727 ||  || — || September 19, 2001 || Socorro || LINEAR || — || align=right | 1.7 km || 
|-id=728 bgcolor=#fefefe
| 124728 ||  || — || September 16, 2001 || Socorro || LINEAR || NYS || align=right data-sort-value="0.96" | 960 m || 
|-id=729 bgcolor=#C2FFFF
| 124729 ||  || — || September 16, 2001 || Socorro || LINEAR || L5 || align=right | 16 km || 
|-id=730 bgcolor=#fefefe
| 124730 ||  || — || September 16, 2001 || Socorro || LINEAR || V || align=right | 1.3 km || 
|-id=731 bgcolor=#fefefe
| 124731 ||  || — || September 16, 2001 || Socorro || LINEAR || — || align=right | 1.5 km || 
|-id=732 bgcolor=#fefefe
| 124732 ||  || — || September 17, 2001 || Socorro || LINEAR || — || align=right | 1.4 km || 
|-id=733 bgcolor=#fefefe
| 124733 ||  || — || September 17, 2001 || Socorro || LINEAR || FLO || align=right | 1.2 km || 
|-id=734 bgcolor=#fefefe
| 124734 ||  || — || September 17, 2001 || Socorro || LINEAR || FLO || align=right | 1.5 km || 
|-id=735 bgcolor=#fefefe
| 124735 ||  || — || September 19, 2001 || Socorro || LINEAR || MAS || align=right | 1.4 km || 
|-id=736 bgcolor=#E9E9E9
| 124736 ||  || — || September 19, 2001 || Socorro || LINEAR || — || align=right | 3.3 km || 
|-id=737 bgcolor=#E9E9E9
| 124737 ||  || — || September 19, 2001 || Socorro || LINEAR || — || align=right | 2.9 km || 
|-id=738 bgcolor=#fefefe
| 124738 ||  || — || September 19, 2001 || Socorro || LINEAR || MAS || align=right | 1.4 km || 
|-id=739 bgcolor=#fefefe
| 124739 ||  || — || September 19, 2001 || Socorro || LINEAR || EUT || align=right | 1.4 km || 
|-id=740 bgcolor=#fefefe
| 124740 ||  || — || September 19, 2001 || Socorro || LINEAR || — || align=right | 1.6 km || 
|-id=741 bgcolor=#fefefe
| 124741 ||  || — || September 19, 2001 || Socorro || LINEAR || — || align=right data-sort-value="0.91" | 910 m || 
|-id=742 bgcolor=#fefefe
| 124742 ||  || — || September 19, 2001 || Socorro || LINEAR || FLO || align=right | 1.1 km || 
|-id=743 bgcolor=#fefefe
| 124743 ||  || — || September 19, 2001 || Socorro || LINEAR || — || align=right | 1.1 km || 
|-id=744 bgcolor=#fefefe
| 124744 ||  || — || September 19, 2001 || Socorro || LINEAR || FLO || align=right | 1.1 km || 
|-id=745 bgcolor=#fefefe
| 124745 ||  || — || September 19, 2001 || Socorro || LINEAR || NYS || align=right | 1.5 km || 
|-id=746 bgcolor=#fefefe
| 124746 ||  || — || September 19, 2001 || Socorro || LINEAR || — || align=right | 1.3 km || 
|-id=747 bgcolor=#fefefe
| 124747 ||  || — || September 19, 2001 || Socorro || LINEAR || NYS || align=right data-sort-value="0.92" | 920 m || 
|-id=748 bgcolor=#fefefe
| 124748 ||  || — || September 19, 2001 || Socorro || LINEAR || — || align=right | 1.3 km || 
|-id=749 bgcolor=#fefefe
| 124749 ||  || — || September 19, 2001 || Socorro || LINEAR || — || align=right | 1.5 km || 
|-id=750 bgcolor=#fefefe
| 124750 ||  || — || September 19, 2001 || Socorro || LINEAR || — || align=right | 1.6 km || 
|-id=751 bgcolor=#E9E9E9
| 124751 ||  || — || September 19, 2001 || Socorro || LINEAR || EUN || align=right | 2.1 km || 
|-id=752 bgcolor=#fefefe
| 124752 ||  || — || September 19, 2001 || Socorro || LINEAR || — || align=right | 1.2 km || 
|-id=753 bgcolor=#fefefe
| 124753 ||  || — || September 19, 2001 || Socorro || LINEAR || FLO || align=right | 1.2 km || 
|-id=754 bgcolor=#d6d6d6
| 124754 ||  || — || September 19, 2001 || Socorro || LINEAR || — || align=right | 5.5 km || 
|-id=755 bgcolor=#fefefe
| 124755 ||  || — || September 19, 2001 || Socorro || LINEAR || FLO || align=right | 1.1 km || 
|-id=756 bgcolor=#fefefe
| 124756 ||  || — || September 19, 2001 || Socorro || LINEAR || NYS || align=right | 3.3 km || 
|-id=757 bgcolor=#fefefe
| 124757 ||  || — || September 19, 2001 || Socorro || LINEAR || NYS || align=right | 1.3 km || 
|-id=758 bgcolor=#fefefe
| 124758 ||  || — || September 19, 2001 || Socorro || LINEAR || — || align=right | 1.2 km || 
|-id=759 bgcolor=#fefefe
| 124759 ||  || — || September 19, 2001 || Socorro || LINEAR || MAS || align=right | 1.6 km || 
|-id=760 bgcolor=#fefefe
| 124760 ||  || — || September 19, 2001 || Socorro || LINEAR || V || align=right | 1.2 km || 
|-id=761 bgcolor=#fefefe
| 124761 ||  || — || September 19, 2001 || Socorro || LINEAR || FLO || align=right | 1.2 km || 
|-id=762 bgcolor=#fefefe
| 124762 ||  || — || September 19, 2001 || Socorro || LINEAR || MAS || align=right | 1.9 km || 
|-id=763 bgcolor=#fefefe
| 124763 ||  || — || September 19, 2001 || Socorro || LINEAR || — || align=right | 1.6 km || 
|-id=764 bgcolor=#fefefe
| 124764 ||  || — || September 19, 2001 || Socorro || LINEAR || NYS || align=right | 1.2 km || 
|-id=765 bgcolor=#fefefe
| 124765 ||  || — || September 19, 2001 || Socorro || LINEAR || NYS || align=right | 1.6 km || 
|-id=766 bgcolor=#fefefe
| 124766 ||  || — || September 19, 2001 || Socorro || LINEAR || — || align=right | 1.8 km || 
|-id=767 bgcolor=#fefefe
| 124767 ||  || — || September 19, 2001 || Socorro || LINEAR || — || align=right | 1.8 km || 
|-id=768 bgcolor=#fefefe
| 124768 ||  || — || September 19, 2001 || Socorro || LINEAR || MAS || align=right | 1.4 km || 
|-id=769 bgcolor=#fefefe
| 124769 ||  || — || September 19, 2001 || Socorro || LINEAR || V || align=right | 1.3 km || 
|-id=770 bgcolor=#fefefe
| 124770 ||  || — || September 19, 2001 || Socorro || LINEAR || NYS || align=right | 1.4 km || 
|-id=771 bgcolor=#fefefe
| 124771 ||  || — || September 19, 2001 || Socorro || LINEAR || MAS || align=right | 1.2 km || 
|-id=772 bgcolor=#fefefe
| 124772 ||  || — || September 19, 2001 || Socorro || LINEAR || MAS || align=right | 1.6 km || 
|-id=773 bgcolor=#fefefe
| 124773 ||  || — || September 19, 2001 || Socorro || LINEAR || — || align=right | 1.1 km || 
|-id=774 bgcolor=#fefefe
| 124774 ||  || — || September 19, 2001 || Socorro || LINEAR || — || align=right data-sort-value="0.94" | 940 m || 
|-id=775 bgcolor=#fefefe
| 124775 ||  || — || September 19, 2001 || Socorro || LINEAR || — || align=right | 1.5 km || 
|-id=776 bgcolor=#fefefe
| 124776 ||  || — || September 19, 2001 || Socorro || LINEAR || FLO || align=right | 1.4 km || 
|-id=777 bgcolor=#fefefe
| 124777 ||  || — || September 19, 2001 || Socorro || LINEAR || — || align=right | 1.5 km || 
|-id=778 bgcolor=#fefefe
| 124778 ||  || — || September 19, 2001 || Socorro || LINEAR || MAS || align=right | 1.3 km || 
|-id=779 bgcolor=#fefefe
| 124779 ||  || — || September 19, 2001 || Socorro || LINEAR || — || align=right | 2.0 km || 
|-id=780 bgcolor=#fefefe
| 124780 ||  || — || September 19, 2001 || Socorro || LINEAR || — || align=right data-sort-value="0.95" | 950 m || 
|-id=781 bgcolor=#fefefe
| 124781 ||  || — || September 19, 2001 || Socorro || LINEAR || — || align=right | 1.6 km || 
|-id=782 bgcolor=#fefefe
| 124782 ||  || — || September 19, 2001 || Socorro || LINEAR || NYS || align=right | 1.8 km || 
|-id=783 bgcolor=#E9E9E9
| 124783 ||  || — || September 19, 2001 || Socorro || LINEAR || — || align=right | 4.0 km || 
|-id=784 bgcolor=#fefefe
| 124784 ||  || — || September 19, 2001 || Socorro || LINEAR || — || align=right | 1.7 km || 
|-id=785 bgcolor=#fefefe
| 124785 ||  || — || September 19, 2001 || Socorro || LINEAR || — || align=right | 1.9 km || 
|-id=786 bgcolor=#fefefe
| 124786 ||  || — || September 19, 2001 || Socorro || LINEAR || — || align=right | 1.8 km || 
|-id=787 bgcolor=#fefefe
| 124787 ||  || — || September 19, 2001 || Socorro || LINEAR || MAS || align=right | 1.5 km || 
|-id=788 bgcolor=#fefefe
| 124788 ||  || — || September 19, 2001 || Socorro || LINEAR || — || align=right | 1.9 km || 
|-id=789 bgcolor=#fefefe
| 124789 ||  || — || September 19, 2001 || Socorro || LINEAR || V || align=right | 1.6 km || 
|-id=790 bgcolor=#fefefe
| 124790 ||  || — || September 20, 2001 || Socorro || LINEAR || — || align=right | 1.2 km || 
|-id=791 bgcolor=#d6d6d6
| 124791 ||  || — || September 20, 2001 || Socorro || LINEAR || SHU3:2 || align=right | 12 km || 
|-id=792 bgcolor=#fefefe
| 124792 ||  || — || September 21, 2001 || Socorro || LINEAR || V || align=right | 1.3 km || 
|-id=793 bgcolor=#fefefe
| 124793 ||  || — || September 25, 2001 || Desert Eagle || W. K. Y. Yeung || NYS || align=right | 1.2 km || 
|-id=794 bgcolor=#fefefe
| 124794 ||  || — || September 25, 2001 || Desert Eagle || W. K. Y. Yeung || — || align=right | 2.0 km || 
|-id=795 bgcolor=#fefefe
| 124795 ||  || — || September 25, 2001 || Desert Eagle || W. K. Y. Yeung || MAS || align=right | 1.3 km || 
|-id=796 bgcolor=#E9E9E9
| 124796 ||  || — || September 25, 2001 || Desert Eagle || W. K. Y. Yeung || — || align=right | 2.8 km || 
|-id=797 bgcolor=#E9E9E9
| 124797 ||  || — || September 25, 2001 || Desert Eagle || W. K. Y. Yeung || — || align=right | 4.2 km || 
|-id=798 bgcolor=#fefefe
| 124798 ||  || — || September 25, 2001 || Desert Eagle || W. K. Y. Yeung || — || align=right | 1.3 km || 
|-id=799 bgcolor=#fefefe
| 124799 ||  || — || September 20, 2001 || Socorro || LINEAR || — || align=right | 1.6 km || 
|-id=800 bgcolor=#fefefe
| 124800 ||  || — || September 21, 2001 || Socorro || LINEAR || NYS || align=right | 1.4 km || 
|}

124801–124900 

|-bgcolor=#fefefe
| 124801 ||  || — || September 26, 2001 || Socorro || LINEAR || PHO || align=right | 1.9 km || 
|-id=802 bgcolor=#fefefe
| 124802 ||  || — || September 21, 2001 || Anderson Mesa || LONEOS || — || align=right | 2.2 km || 
|-id=803 bgcolor=#fefefe
| 124803 ||  || — || September 21, 2001 || Anderson Mesa || LONEOS || FLO || align=right | 1.4 km || 
|-id=804 bgcolor=#fefefe
| 124804 ||  || — || September 21, 2001 || Anderson Mesa || LONEOS || — || align=right | 1.3 km || 
|-id=805 bgcolor=#fefefe
| 124805 ||  || — || September 21, 2001 || Anderson Mesa || LONEOS || V || align=right | 1.3 km || 
|-id=806 bgcolor=#fefefe
| 124806 ||  || — || September 21, 2001 || Anderson Mesa || LONEOS || NYS || align=right | 1.0 km || 
|-id=807 bgcolor=#fefefe
| 124807 ||  || — || September 21, 2001 || Anderson Mesa || LONEOS || NYS || align=right | 1.2 km || 
|-id=808 bgcolor=#fefefe
| 124808 ||  || — || September 21, 2001 || Anderson Mesa || LONEOS || MAS || align=right | 1.8 km || 
|-id=809 bgcolor=#E9E9E9
| 124809 ||  || — || September 21, 2001 || Anderson Mesa || LONEOS || — || align=right | 1.8 km || 
|-id=810 bgcolor=#fefefe
| 124810 ||  || — || September 21, 2001 || Socorro || LINEAR || — || align=right | 1.8 km || 
|-id=811 bgcolor=#E9E9E9
| 124811 ||  || — || September 22, 2001 || Socorro || LINEAR || — || align=right | 3.6 km || 
|-id=812 bgcolor=#FA8072
| 124812 ||  || — || September 22, 2001 || Kitt Peak || Spacewatch || PHO || align=right | 1.4 km || 
|-id=813 bgcolor=#fefefe
| 124813 ||  || — || September 22, 2001 || Kitt Peak || Spacewatch || FLO || align=right | 1.2 km || 
|-id=814 bgcolor=#fefefe
| 124814 ||  || — || September 22, 2001 || Kitt Peak || Spacewatch || — || align=right | 1.3 km || 
|-id=815 bgcolor=#E9E9E9
| 124815 ||  || — || September 22, 2001 || Palomar || NEAT || EUN || align=right | 3.5 km || 
|-id=816 bgcolor=#fefefe
| 124816 ||  || — || September 28, 2001 || Palomar || NEAT || FLO || align=right | 1.2 km || 
|-id=817 bgcolor=#fefefe
| 124817 ||  || — || September 16, 2001 || Socorro || LINEAR || FLO || align=right | 1.8 km || 
|-id=818 bgcolor=#fefefe
| 124818 ||  || — || September 16, 2001 || Socorro || LINEAR || — || align=right | 1.4 km || 
|-id=819 bgcolor=#fefefe
| 124819 ||  || — || September 20, 2001 || Socorro || LINEAR || — || align=right | 1.2 km || 
|-id=820 bgcolor=#fefefe
| 124820 ||  || — || September 21, 2001 || Socorro || LINEAR || MAS || align=right | 1.3 km || 
|-id=821 bgcolor=#fefefe
| 124821 ||  || — || September 21, 2001 || Socorro || LINEAR || V || align=right | 1.1 km || 
|-id=822 bgcolor=#fefefe
| 124822 ||  || — || September 22, 2001 || Socorro || LINEAR || — || align=right data-sort-value="0.92" | 920 m || 
|-id=823 bgcolor=#fefefe
| 124823 ||  || — || September 20, 2001 || Socorro || LINEAR || V || align=right | 1.2 km || 
|-id=824 bgcolor=#fefefe
| 124824 ||  || — || September 21, 2001 || Socorro || LINEAR || FLO || align=right | 1.1 km || 
|-id=825 bgcolor=#fefefe
| 124825 ||  || — || September 21, 2001 || Socorro || LINEAR || — || align=right | 2.3 km || 
|-id=826 bgcolor=#fefefe
| 124826 ||  || — || September 25, 2001 || Socorro || LINEAR || V || align=right | 1.5 km || 
|-id=827 bgcolor=#E9E9E9
| 124827 ||  || — || September 21, 2001 || Socorro || LINEAR || — || align=right | 1.7 km || 
|-id=828 bgcolor=#fefefe
| 124828 ||  || — || September 16, 2001 || Socorro || LINEAR || — || align=right | 1.4 km || 
|-id=829 bgcolor=#fefefe
| 124829 ||  || — || September 17, 2001 || Anderson Mesa || LONEOS || FLO || align=right | 1.0 km || 
|-id=830 bgcolor=#fefefe
| 124830 ||  || — || September 18, 2001 || Anderson Mesa || LONEOS || V || align=right | 1.1 km || 
|-id=831 bgcolor=#fefefe
| 124831 ||  || — || September 18, 2001 || Anderson Mesa || LONEOS || FLO || align=right | 1.0 km || 
|-id=832 bgcolor=#fefefe
| 124832 ||  || — || September 19, 2001 || Palomar || NEAT || V || align=right | 1.2 km || 
|-id=833 bgcolor=#fefefe
| 124833 ||  || — || September 20, 2001 || Socorro || LINEAR || — || align=right data-sort-value="0.96" | 960 m || 
|-id=834 bgcolor=#FA8072
| 124834 || 2001 TH || — || October 8, 2001 || Socorro || LINEAR || PHO || align=right | 1.8 km || 
|-id=835 bgcolor=#fefefe
| 124835 ||  || — || October 7, 2001 || Palomar || NEAT || — || align=right | 1.3 km || 
|-id=836 bgcolor=#fefefe
| 124836 ||  || — || October 7, 2001 || Palomar || NEAT || — || align=right | 1.5 km || 
|-id=837 bgcolor=#fefefe
| 124837 ||  || — || October 10, 2001 || Palomar || NEAT || FLO || align=right data-sort-value="0.90" | 900 m || 
|-id=838 bgcolor=#fefefe
| 124838 ||  || — || October 10, 2001 || Palomar || NEAT || — || align=right | 1.3 km || 
|-id=839 bgcolor=#fefefe
| 124839 ||  || — || October 10, 2001 || Palomar || NEAT || V || align=right | 1.3 km || 
|-id=840 bgcolor=#fefefe
| 124840 ||  || — || October 10, 2001 || Palomar || NEAT || ERI || align=right | 1.6 km || 
|-id=841 bgcolor=#fefefe
| 124841 ||  || — || October 9, 2001 || Socorro || LINEAR || — || align=right | 2.0 km || 
|-id=842 bgcolor=#fefefe
| 124842 ||  || — || October 9, 2001 || Socorro || LINEAR || V || align=right | 1.3 km || 
|-id=843 bgcolor=#fefefe
| 124843 ||  || — || October 13, 2001 || Socorro || LINEAR || FLO || align=right | 1.3 km || 
|-id=844 bgcolor=#fefefe
| 124844 Hirotamasao ||  ||  || October 13, 2001 || Shishikui || H. Maeno || NYS || align=right | 1.1 km || 
|-id=845 bgcolor=#fefefe
| 124845 Clinteastwood ||  ||  || October 12, 2001 || Goodricke-Pigott || R. A. Tucker || FLO || align=right | 1.2 km || 
|-id=846 bgcolor=#fefefe
| 124846 ||  || — || October 11, 2001 || Socorro || LINEAR || — || align=right | 2.8 km || 
|-id=847 bgcolor=#fefefe
| 124847 ||  || — || October 11, 2001 || Socorro || LINEAR || V || align=right | 1.5 km || 
|-id=848 bgcolor=#fefefe
| 124848 ||  || — || October 11, 2001 || Socorro || LINEAR || — || align=right | 1.9 km || 
|-id=849 bgcolor=#fefefe
| 124849 ||  || — || October 11, 2001 || Socorro || LINEAR || PHO || align=right | 1.7 km || 
|-id=850 bgcolor=#E9E9E9
| 124850 ||  || — || October 14, 2001 || Desert Eagle || W. K. Y. Yeung || — || align=right | 2.0 km || 
|-id=851 bgcolor=#fefefe
| 124851 ||  || — || October 14, 2001 || Desert Eagle || W. K. Y. Yeung || FLO || align=right | 1.1 km || 
|-id=852 bgcolor=#fefefe
| 124852 ||  || — || October 14, 2001 || Needville || Needville Obs. || PHO || align=right | 3.3 km || 
|-id=853 bgcolor=#fefefe
| 124853 ||  || — || October 9, 2001 || Socorro || LINEAR || — || align=right | 1.4 km || 
|-id=854 bgcolor=#fefefe
| 124854 ||  || — || October 9, 2001 || Socorro || LINEAR || — || align=right | 2.3 km || 
|-id=855 bgcolor=#fefefe
| 124855 ||  || — || October 9, 2001 || Socorro || LINEAR || — || align=right | 2.1 km || 
|-id=856 bgcolor=#fefefe
| 124856 ||  || — || October 13, 2001 || Socorro || LINEAR || NYS || align=right | 1.1 km || 
|-id=857 bgcolor=#fefefe
| 124857 ||  || — || October 14, 2001 || Socorro || LINEAR || — || align=right | 1.9 km || 
|-id=858 bgcolor=#fefefe
| 124858 ||  || — || October 14, 2001 || Socorro || LINEAR || — || align=right | 1.6 km || 
|-id=859 bgcolor=#fefefe
| 124859 ||  || — || October 14, 2001 || Socorro || LINEAR || ERI || align=right | 3.1 km || 
|-id=860 bgcolor=#fefefe
| 124860 ||  || — || October 14, 2001 || Socorro || LINEAR || FLO || align=right | 1.4 km || 
|-id=861 bgcolor=#fefefe
| 124861 ||  || — || October 14, 2001 || Socorro || LINEAR || — || align=right | 1.8 km || 
|-id=862 bgcolor=#fefefe
| 124862 ||  || — || October 14, 2001 || Socorro || LINEAR || — || align=right | 1.4 km || 
|-id=863 bgcolor=#fefefe
| 124863 ||  || — || October 14, 2001 || Socorro || LINEAR || V || align=right | 1.2 km || 
|-id=864 bgcolor=#E9E9E9
| 124864 ||  || — || October 14, 2001 || Socorro || LINEAR || — || align=right | 2.3 km || 
|-id=865 bgcolor=#fefefe
| 124865 ||  || — || October 14, 2001 || Socorro || LINEAR || — || align=right | 1.2 km || 
|-id=866 bgcolor=#fefefe
| 124866 ||  || — || October 14, 2001 || Socorro || LINEAR || — || align=right | 1.8 km || 
|-id=867 bgcolor=#fefefe
| 124867 ||  || — || October 14, 2001 || Socorro || LINEAR || FLO || align=right | 1.2 km || 
|-id=868 bgcolor=#fefefe
| 124868 ||  || — || October 14, 2001 || Socorro || LINEAR || — || align=right | 2.0 km || 
|-id=869 bgcolor=#fefefe
| 124869 ||  || — || October 14, 2001 || Socorro || LINEAR || FLO || align=right | 1.4 km || 
|-id=870 bgcolor=#fefefe
| 124870 ||  || — || October 14, 2001 || Socorro || LINEAR || — || align=right | 3.3 km || 
|-id=871 bgcolor=#fefefe
| 124871 ||  || — || October 14, 2001 || Socorro || LINEAR || — || align=right | 1.9 km || 
|-id=872 bgcolor=#fefefe
| 124872 ||  || — || October 14, 2001 || Socorro || LINEAR || — || align=right | 1.9 km || 
|-id=873 bgcolor=#E9E9E9
| 124873 ||  || — || October 14, 2001 || Socorro || LINEAR || — || align=right | 2.2 km || 
|-id=874 bgcolor=#E9E9E9
| 124874 ||  || — || October 14, 2001 || Socorro || LINEAR || — || align=right | 2.6 km || 
|-id=875 bgcolor=#fefefe
| 124875 ||  || — || October 14, 2001 || Socorro || LINEAR || V || align=right | 1.6 km || 
|-id=876 bgcolor=#fefefe
| 124876 ||  || — || October 14, 2001 || Socorro || LINEAR || FLO || align=right | 1.5 km || 
|-id=877 bgcolor=#fefefe
| 124877 ||  || — || October 14, 2001 || Socorro || LINEAR || — || align=right | 2.2 km || 
|-id=878 bgcolor=#fefefe
| 124878 ||  || — || October 14, 2001 || Socorro || LINEAR || — || align=right | 2.2 km || 
|-id=879 bgcolor=#fefefe
| 124879 ||  || — || October 14, 2001 || Socorro || LINEAR || — || align=right | 2.0 km || 
|-id=880 bgcolor=#E9E9E9
| 124880 ||  || — || October 14, 2001 || Socorro || LINEAR || — || align=right | 1.5 km || 
|-id=881 bgcolor=#fefefe
| 124881 ||  || — || October 14, 2001 || Socorro || LINEAR || PHO || align=right | 4.6 km || 
|-id=882 bgcolor=#E9E9E9
| 124882 ||  || — || October 14, 2001 || Socorro || LINEAR || — || align=right | 6.1 km || 
|-id=883 bgcolor=#fefefe
| 124883 ||  || — || October 14, 2001 || Socorro || LINEAR || — || align=right | 1.9 km || 
|-id=884 bgcolor=#fefefe
| 124884 ||  || — || October 14, 2001 || Socorro || LINEAR || — || align=right | 2.1 km || 
|-id=885 bgcolor=#fefefe
| 124885 ||  || — || October 14, 2001 || Socorro || LINEAR || — || align=right | 1.9 km || 
|-id=886 bgcolor=#fefefe
| 124886 ||  || — || October 14, 2001 || Socorro || LINEAR || — || align=right | 4.6 km || 
|-id=887 bgcolor=#fefefe
| 124887 ||  || — || October 14, 2001 || Desert Eagle || W. K. Y. Yeung || NYS || align=right | 1.2 km || 
|-id=888 bgcolor=#fefefe
| 124888 ||  || — || October 14, 2001 || Desert Eagle || W. K. Y. Yeung || MAS || align=right | 1.9 km || 
|-id=889 bgcolor=#fefefe
| 124889 ||  || — || October 14, 2001 || Desert Eagle || W. K. Y. Yeung || NYS || align=right | 3.1 km || 
|-id=890 bgcolor=#fefefe
| 124890 ||  || — || October 15, 2001 || Desert Eagle || W. K. Y. Yeung || FLO || align=right | 1.3 km || 
|-id=891 bgcolor=#fefefe
| 124891 ||  || — || October 14, 2001 || Cima Ekar || ADAS || — || align=right | 1.8 km || 
|-id=892 bgcolor=#fefefe
| 124892 ||  || — || October 11, 2001 || Palomar || NEAT || — || align=right | 1.1 km || 
|-id=893 bgcolor=#fefefe
| 124893 ||  || — || October 15, 2001 || Desert Eagle || W. K. Y. Yeung || V || align=right | 1.7 km || 
|-id=894 bgcolor=#fefefe
| 124894 ||  || — || October 15, 2001 || Desert Eagle || W. K. Y. Yeung || NYS || align=right | 1.0 km || 
|-id=895 bgcolor=#fefefe
| 124895 ||  || — || October 13, 2001 || Socorro || LINEAR || — || align=right | 1.3 km || 
|-id=896 bgcolor=#fefefe
| 124896 ||  || — || October 13, 2001 || Socorro || LINEAR || — || align=right | 2.3 km || 
|-id=897 bgcolor=#fefefe
| 124897 ||  || — || October 13, 2001 || Socorro || LINEAR || — || align=right | 1.4 km || 
|-id=898 bgcolor=#E9E9E9
| 124898 ||  || — || October 13, 2001 || Socorro || LINEAR || — || align=right | 2.1 km || 
|-id=899 bgcolor=#fefefe
| 124899 ||  || — || October 13, 2001 || Socorro || LINEAR || — || align=right | 2.4 km || 
|-id=900 bgcolor=#fefefe
| 124900 ||  || — || October 13, 2001 || Socorro || LINEAR || — || align=right | 2.2 km || 
|}

124901–125000 

|-bgcolor=#fefefe
| 124901 ||  || — || October 13, 2001 || Socorro || LINEAR || — || align=right | 3.6 km || 
|-id=902 bgcolor=#fefefe
| 124902 ||  || — || October 13, 2001 || Socorro || LINEAR || — || align=right data-sort-value="0.85" | 850 m || 
|-id=903 bgcolor=#fefefe
| 124903 ||  || — || October 13, 2001 || Socorro || LINEAR || — || align=right | 1.0 km || 
|-id=904 bgcolor=#fefefe
| 124904 ||  || — || October 13, 2001 || Socorro || LINEAR || — || align=right | 4.2 km || 
|-id=905 bgcolor=#fefefe
| 124905 ||  || — || October 13, 2001 || Socorro || LINEAR || — || align=right | 3.7 km || 
|-id=906 bgcolor=#E9E9E9
| 124906 ||  || — || October 13, 2001 || Socorro || LINEAR || — || align=right | 1.7 km || 
|-id=907 bgcolor=#fefefe
| 124907 ||  || — || October 13, 2001 || Socorro || LINEAR || NYS || align=right | 1.5 km || 
|-id=908 bgcolor=#E9E9E9
| 124908 ||  || — || October 13, 2001 || Socorro || LINEAR || — || align=right | 1.4 km || 
|-id=909 bgcolor=#fefefe
| 124909 ||  || — || October 13, 2001 || Socorro || LINEAR || — || align=right | 1.0 km || 
|-id=910 bgcolor=#fefefe
| 124910 ||  || — || October 13, 2001 || Socorro || LINEAR || — || align=right | 3.5 km || 
|-id=911 bgcolor=#fefefe
| 124911 ||  || — || October 13, 2001 || Socorro || LINEAR || NYS || align=right | 3.2 km || 
|-id=912 bgcolor=#fefefe
| 124912 ||  || — || October 13, 2001 || Socorro || LINEAR || MAS || align=right | 1.1 km || 
|-id=913 bgcolor=#E9E9E9
| 124913 ||  || — || October 13, 2001 || Socorro || LINEAR || — || align=right | 1.4 km || 
|-id=914 bgcolor=#E9E9E9
| 124914 ||  || — || October 13, 2001 || Socorro || LINEAR || — || align=right | 2.0 km || 
|-id=915 bgcolor=#fefefe
| 124915 ||  || — || October 13, 2001 || Socorro || LINEAR || — || align=right | 1.4 km || 
|-id=916 bgcolor=#fefefe
| 124916 ||  || — || October 13, 2001 || Socorro || LINEAR || NYS || align=right | 1.4 km || 
|-id=917 bgcolor=#fefefe
| 124917 ||  || — || October 13, 2001 || Socorro || LINEAR || MAS || align=right | 1.3 km || 
|-id=918 bgcolor=#fefefe
| 124918 ||  || — || October 13, 2001 || Socorro || LINEAR || NYS || align=right | 1.3 km || 
|-id=919 bgcolor=#fefefe
| 124919 ||  || — || October 13, 2001 || Socorro || LINEAR || FLO || align=right | 1.3 km || 
|-id=920 bgcolor=#fefefe
| 124920 ||  || — || October 13, 2001 || Socorro || LINEAR || — || align=right | 2.9 km || 
|-id=921 bgcolor=#fefefe
| 124921 ||  || — || October 13, 2001 || Socorro || LINEAR || — || align=right | 1.3 km || 
|-id=922 bgcolor=#fefefe
| 124922 ||  || — || October 13, 2001 || Socorro || LINEAR || — || align=right | 1.3 km || 
|-id=923 bgcolor=#fefefe
| 124923 ||  || — || October 13, 2001 || Socorro || LINEAR || — || align=right data-sort-value="0.89" | 890 m || 
|-id=924 bgcolor=#fefefe
| 124924 ||  || — || October 13, 2001 || Socorro || LINEAR || NYS || align=right | 1.0 km || 
|-id=925 bgcolor=#fefefe
| 124925 ||  || — || October 13, 2001 || Socorro || LINEAR || FLO || align=right | 1.5 km || 
|-id=926 bgcolor=#d6d6d6
| 124926 ||  || — || October 13, 2001 || Socorro || LINEAR || — || align=right | 6.8 km || 
|-id=927 bgcolor=#fefefe
| 124927 ||  || — || October 13, 2001 || Socorro || LINEAR || NYS || align=right | 2.0 km || 
|-id=928 bgcolor=#fefefe
| 124928 ||  || — || October 13, 2001 || Socorro || LINEAR || — || align=right | 1.2 km || 
|-id=929 bgcolor=#fefefe
| 124929 ||  || — || October 13, 2001 || Socorro || LINEAR || — || align=right | 1.6 km || 
|-id=930 bgcolor=#fefefe
| 124930 ||  || — || October 13, 2001 || Socorro || LINEAR || — || align=right | 1.9 km || 
|-id=931 bgcolor=#fefefe
| 124931 ||  || — || October 13, 2001 || Socorro || LINEAR || NYS || align=right | 1.0 km || 
|-id=932 bgcolor=#fefefe
| 124932 ||  || — || October 13, 2001 || Socorro || LINEAR || — || align=right | 1.8 km || 
|-id=933 bgcolor=#fefefe
| 124933 ||  || — || October 13, 2001 || Socorro || LINEAR || V || align=right | 1.5 km || 
|-id=934 bgcolor=#fefefe
| 124934 ||  || — || October 13, 2001 || Socorro || LINEAR || MAS || align=right | 1.5 km || 
|-id=935 bgcolor=#fefefe
| 124935 ||  || — || October 13, 2001 || Socorro || LINEAR || NYS || align=right | 1.5 km || 
|-id=936 bgcolor=#E9E9E9
| 124936 ||  || — || October 13, 2001 || Socorro || LINEAR || — || align=right | 1.9 km || 
|-id=937 bgcolor=#fefefe
| 124937 ||  || — || October 13, 2001 || Socorro || LINEAR || FLO || align=right | 1.3 km || 
|-id=938 bgcolor=#fefefe
| 124938 ||  || — || October 13, 2001 || Socorro || LINEAR || — || align=right | 3.5 km || 
|-id=939 bgcolor=#fefefe
| 124939 ||  || — || October 13, 2001 || Socorro || LINEAR || — || align=right | 2.2 km || 
|-id=940 bgcolor=#fefefe
| 124940 ||  || — || October 13, 2001 || Socorro || LINEAR || — || align=right | 2.9 km || 
|-id=941 bgcolor=#fefefe
| 124941 ||  || — || October 13, 2001 || Socorro || LINEAR || NYS || align=right | 1.3 km || 
|-id=942 bgcolor=#fefefe
| 124942 ||  || — || October 13, 2001 || Socorro || LINEAR || — || align=right | 1.1 km || 
|-id=943 bgcolor=#fefefe
| 124943 ||  || — || October 13, 2001 || Socorro || LINEAR || — || align=right | 1.6 km || 
|-id=944 bgcolor=#fefefe
| 124944 ||  || — || October 14, 2001 || Socorro || LINEAR || ERI || align=right | 3.1 km || 
|-id=945 bgcolor=#fefefe
| 124945 ||  || — || October 14, 2001 || Socorro || LINEAR || — || align=right | 1.8 km || 
|-id=946 bgcolor=#fefefe
| 124946 ||  || — || October 14, 2001 || Socorro || LINEAR || — || align=right | 1.6 km || 
|-id=947 bgcolor=#fefefe
| 124947 ||  || — || October 14, 2001 || Socorro || LINEAR || — || align=right | 1.3 km || 
|-id=948 bgcolor=#fefefe
| 124948 ||  || — || October 14, 2001 || Socorro || LINEAR || FLO || align=right | 1.8 km || 
|-id=949 bgcolor=#fefefe
| 124949 ||  || — || October 14, 2001 || Socorro || LINEAR || FLO || align=right | 1.1 km || 
|-id=950 bgcolor=#fefefe
| 124950 ||  || — || October 14, 2001 || Socorro || LINEAR || — || align=right | 1.5 km || 
|-id=951 bgcolor=#fefefe
| 124951 ||  || — || October 14, 2001 || Socorro || LINEAR || FLO || align=right | 1.6 km || 
|-id=952 bgcolor=#fefefe
| 124952 ||  || — || October 14, 2001 || Socorro || LINEAR || V || align=right | 1.3 km || 
|-id=953 bgcolor=#fefefe
| 124953 ||  || — || October 14, 2001 || Socorro || LINEAR || — || align=right | 1.6 km || 
|-id=954 bgcolor=#fefefe
| 124954 ||  || — || October 14, 2001 || Socorro || LINEAR || — || align=right | 3.3 km || 
|-id=955 bgcolor=#fefefe
| 124955 ||  || — || October 14, 2001 || Socorro || LINEAR || — || align=right | 1.2 km || 
|-id=956 bgcolor=#fefefe
| 124956 ||  || — || October 14, 2001 || Socorro || LINEAR || — || align=right data-sort-value="0.87" | 870 m || 
|-id=957 bgcolor=#fefefe
| 124957 ||  || — || October 14, 2001 || Socorro || LINEAR || FLO || align=right | 1.1 km || 
|-id=958 bgcolor=#fefefe
| 124958 ||  || — || October 14, 2001 || Socorro || LINEAR || FLO || align=right | 1.2 km || 
|-id=959 bgcolor=#fefefe
| 124959 ||  || — || October 14, 2001 || Socorro || LINEAR || — || align=right | 1.3 km || 
|-id=960 bgcolor=#E9E9E9
| 124960 ||  || — || October 14, 2001 || Socorro || LINEAR || RAF || align=right | 2.0 km || 
|-id=961 bgcolor=#fefefe
| 124961 ||  || — || October 14, 2001 || Socorro || LINEAR || NYS || align=right | 1.3 km || 
|-id=962 bgcolor=#fefefe
| 124962 ||  || — || October 14, 2001 || Socorro || LINEAR || — || align=right | 1.6 km || 
|-id=963 bgcolor=#fefefe
| 124963 ||  || — || October 15, 2001 || Socorro || LINEAR || — || align=right | 1.5 km || 
|-id=964 bgcolor=#fefefe
| 124964 ||  || — || October 15, 2001 || Desert Eagle || W. K. Y. Yeung || — || align=right | 1.2 km || 
|-id=965 bgcolor=#fefefe
| 124965 ||  || — || October 15, 2001 || Desert Eagle || W. K. Y. Yeung || — || align=right | 2.0 km || 
|-id=966 bgcolor=#fefefe
| 124966 ||  || — || October 13, 2001 || Socorro || LINEAR || NYS || align=right | 1.6 km || 
|-id=967 bgcolor=#E9E9E9
| 124967 ||  || — || October 13, 2001 || Socorro || LINEAR || — || align=right | 3.4 km || 
|-id=968 bgcolor=#fefefe
| 124968 ||  || — || October 13, 2001 || Socorro || LINEAR || V || align=right | 1.7 km || 
|-id=969 bgcolor=#fefefe
| 124969 ||  || — || October 13, 2001 || Socorro || LINEAR || — || align=right | 2.2 km || 
|-id=970 bgcolor=#fefefe
| 124970 ||  || — || October 14, 2001 || Socorro || LINEAR || V || align=right | 1.3 km || 
|-id=971 bgcolor=#fefefe
| 124971 ||  || — || October 14, 2001 || Socorro || LINEAR || V || align=right | 2.2 km || 
|-id=972 bgcolor=#fefefe
| 124972 ||  || — || October 14, 2001 || Socorro || LINEAR || FLO || align=right | 1.6 km || 
|-id=973 bgcolor=#fefefe
| 124973 ||  || — || October 14, 2001 || Socorro || LINEAR || — || align=right | 1.8 km || 
|-id=974 bgcolor=#fefefe
| 124974 ||  || — || October 14, 2001 || Socorro || LINEAR || — || align=right | 1.6 km || 
|-id=975 bgcolor=#E9E9E9
| 124975 ||  || — || October 14, 2001 || Socorro || LINEAR || — || align=right | 4.1 km || 
|-id=976 bgcolor=#E9E9E9
| 124976 ||  || — || October 14, 2001 || Socorro || LINEAR || — || align=right | 1.8 km || 
|-id=977 bgcolor=#fefefe
| 124977 ||  || — || October 14, 2001 || Socorro || LINEAR || — || align=right | 1.6 km || 
|-id=978 bgcolor=#fefefe
| 124978 ||  || — || October 14, 2001 || Socorro || LINEAR || V || align=right | 1.4 km || 
|-id=979 bgcolor=#fefefe
| 124979 ||  || — || October 15, 2001 || Socorro || LINEAR || — || align=right | 1.8 km || 
|-id=980 bgcolor=#fefefe
| 124980 ||  || — || October 15, 2001 || Socorro || LINEAR || — || align=right | 1.7 km || 
|-id=981 bgcolor=#fefefe
| 124981 ||  || — || October 13, 2001 || Kitt Peak || Spacewatch || FLO || align=right data-sort-value="0.77" | 770 m || 
|-id=982 bgcolor=#fefefe
| 124982 ||  || — || October 15, 2001 || Kitt Peak || Spacewatch || MAS || align=right | 1.4 km || 
|-id=983 bgcolor=#fefefe
| 124983 ||  || — || October 10, 2001 || Palomar || NEAT || — || align=right | 1.7 km || 
|-id=984 bgcolor=#fefefe
| 124984 ||  || — || October 10, 2001 || Palomar || NEAT || V || align=right | 1.2 km || 
|-id=985 bgcolor=#C2FFFF
| 124985 ||  || — || October 10, 2001 || Palomar || NEAT || L5 || align=right | 19 km || 
|-id=986 bgcolor=#fefefe
| 124986 ||  || — || October 12, 2001 || Haleakala || NEAT || — || align=right | 1.5 km || 
|-id=987 bgcolor=#E9E9E9
| 124987 ||  || — || October 12, 2001 || Haleakala || NEAT || — || align=right | 3.1 km || 
|-id=988 bgcolor=#fefefe
| 124988 ||  || — || October 10, 2001 || Palomar || NEAT || FLO || align=right | 1.1 km || 
|-id=989 bgcolor=#fefefe
| 124989 ||  || — || October 10, 2001 || Palomar || NEAT || — || align=right | 3.3 km || 
|-id=990 bgcolor=#fefefe
| 124990 ||  || — || October 10, 2001 || Palomar || NEAT || FLO || align=right | 1.1 km || 
|-id=991 bgcolor=#fefefe
| 124991 ||  || — || October 10, 2001 || Palomar || NEAT || — || align=right | 1.3 km || 
|-id=992 bgcolor=#fefefe
| 124992 ||  || — || October 10, 2001 || Palomar || NEAT || — || align=right | 1.4 km || 
|-id=993 bgcolor=#fefefe
| 124993 ||  || — || October 10, 2001 || Palomar || NEAT || — || align=right | 2.0 km || 
|-id=994 bgcolor=#fefefe
| 124994 ||  || — || October 10, 2001 || Palomar || NEAT || — || align=right | 3.5 km || 
|-id=995 bgcolor=#fefefe
| 124995 ||  || — || October 10, 2001 || Palomar || NEAT || V || align=right | 1.2 km || 
|-id=996 bgcolor=#fefefe
| 124996 ||  || — || October 10, 2001 || Palomar || NEAT || — || align=right | 1.2 km || 
|-id=997 bgcolor=#fefefe
| 124997 ||  || — || October 10, 2001 || Palomar || NEAT || — || align=right | 1.7 km || 
|-id=998 bgcolor=#fefefe
| 124998 ||  || — || October 10, 2001 || Palomar || NEAT || — || align=right | 1.7 km || 
|-id=999 bgcolor=#fefefe
| 124999 ||  || — || October 10, 2001 || Palomar || NEAT || ERI || align=right | 2.6 km || 
|-id=000 bgcolor=#fefefe
| 125000 ||  || — || October 10, 2001 || Palomar || NEAT || FLO || align=right | 1.1 km || 
|}

References

External links 
 Discovery Circumstances: Numbered Minor Planets (120001)–(125000) (IAU Minor Planet Center)

0124